= Oeko-Tex =

Standards organisation in the textiles industry

Logo

Oeko-Tex is a registered trade mark of the International Association for Research and Testing in the Field of Textile and Leather Ecology. It is used to represent the product labels and company certificates issued by the Association.

Oeko-Tex labels and certificates confirm the safety of textile products and leather articles from all stages of production. Some also attest to social and environmental conditions in production facilities.

== History ==
The Oeko-Tex Association was founded in March 1992 by the Austrian Textile Research Institute (now OETI - Institut fuer Oekologie, Technik und Innovation) and the German Hohenstein Institute. The Swiss textile testing institute Testex joined in 1993. Other European and Asian testing and research institutes joined in the following years. In 2016, the association reached its current membership count of 17.

In the first year of operation, Oeko-Tex launched Oeko-Tex Standard 100, which emerged from an earlier label developed by OETI in 1989. In 1995, Oeko-Tex Standard 1000 was launched, which included sustainability aspects, followed by Oeko-Tex Standard 100plus, which also examined production processes.

At the beginning of the 2000s, Oeko-Tex Standard 1000 was scrutinized and social aspects and occupational safety were added. As a result, in 2013, Oeko-Tex launched the STeP (Sustainable Textile Production) certification system for sustainable textile production. In 2015, Oeko-Tex introduced Made in Green to replace the Oeko-Tex Standard 100plus and the Spanish Made in Green by AITEX labels.

In 2023, Oeko-Tex launched the certification Organic Cotton.

== Concept ==
The Oeko-Tex Association offers a certification system for companies to review and improve their supply chains. They are developed as a modular system to cover the textile and leather value chain in terms of input, process, and output control as well as supply chain management. The testing system is based on audits of production sites, testing in laboratories as well as evaluation of textile products.

Oeko-Tex partners with initiatives such as Zero Discharge of Hazardous Chemicals (ZDHC). It is a member of the International Social and Environmental Accreditation and Labelling Alliance (ISEAL Alliance) and its labels operate in line with several Sustainable Development Goals.

== Operations ==
The Oeko-Tex Association is headquartered in Zürich (Switzerland). The association includes 17 test and research institutes in Europe and Japan, with offices in over 70 countries around the world (as of 2023).

Oeko-Tex awards:

- Product labels for textile products: Oeko-Tex Standard 100, Oeko-Tex Made in Green and Oeko-Tex Organic Cotton
- Product label for leather articles: Oeko-Tex Leather Standard
- Product label for textile and leather chemicals: Oeko-Tex Eco Passport, Oeko-Tex Made in Green
- Certification for production sites: Oeko-Tex STeP
- Certification for companies: Oeko-Tex Responsible Business

Most Oeko-Tex certification is conducted through the Standard 100 label. Within this standard, most articles tested are articles worn close to the skin in product class II (53% of all certificates), followed by baby articles in product class I (43%) as well as furnishing materials (3%, product class IV) and textiles without direct contact with the skin (1%, product class III) (as of 2011). In the 2018/19 fiscal year, the association awarded more than 21,000 Standard 100 certificates in over 104 countries. This was followed by around 1,333 products that were awarded the Made in Green label. In addition, 140 companies were certified in accordance with STeP. China is the country with the most STeP-certified companies, followed by Bangladesh and Pakistan, and then Turkey, followed by India. In the 2022/23 fiscal year, Oeko-Tex issued more than 43,000 certificates and labels. 21,000 manufacturers, brands and trading companies in more than 100 countries are working with the association and its labels and certifications (as of 2023).

The Standard 100 is a product label for textiles tested for harmful substances with the largest prevalence worldwide. A consumer survey from 2012, conducted by the Institut für Handelsforschung GmbH, revealed that Oeko-Tex is one of the world's best-known textile labels. 42% of all respondents in 13 countries, including Germany, China and Russia, were familiar with the label. In Germany, the label had a recognition level of 70%.

== Oeko-Tex certificates ==
=== Oeko-Tex Standard 100 ===
The Standard 100 product label, introduced in 1992, certifies adherence to the specifications of the standard by the same name, a document of testing methods and limit values for potentially harmful chemicals. There are four product classes:

- Product class I – Items for babies and infants (up to 36 months of age),
- Product class II – Items with direct prolonged or large-area skin contact,
- Product class III – Textiles without or with little skin contact,
- Product class IV – Furnishing materials for decorative purposes (curtains, table linen, carpets, etc.).

=== Oeko-Tex STeP ===
STeP (Sustainable Textile and Leather Production) is a worldwide certification system for production facilities in the textile, leather, and clothing industry. It is a 2013 re-branding of the Oeko-Tex Standard 1000 that had been introduced in 1995. Once issued, the STeP certificate is valid for three years.

=== Oeko-Tex Made in Green ===
Made in Green is a label that certifies the testing of textile and leather products for harmful substances and materials, as well as evaluating environmental production and workplace safety. The Made in Green label replaced the former Oeko-Tex Standard 100plus label in 2015. Product IDs and/or QR codes on the Made in Green label enable consumers to trace the production of the article. The Made in Green label is valid for one year.

=== Oeko-Tex Eco Passport ===
Eco Passport is a certification system through which producers of textile and leather processing chemicals and chemical compounds can corroborate that their products are suitable for sustainable textile and leather production. The program features three sequential assessments, and products that pass all three steps are granted the Eco Passport certification. This label allows for those products to be used in Standard 100-certified products and by STeP-certified manufacturing plants. The Eco Passport label can be issued to producers, traders, and resellers of chemicals and is valid for one year. It works in compliance with several regulations including EU REACH.

=== Oeko-Tex Leather Standard ===
The Leather Standard (introduced 2017) is a system of testing methods, testing criteria and limit values for harmful substances used by the Oeko-Tex member institutes to globally certify the human-ecological safety of leather products: semi-finished leather materials ("Wet blue" – chrome-tanned hides, "Wet white" – vegetable tanned hides), leather, bonded leather and ready-made leather articles. When certifying leather products contain non-leather (e.g. textile or metallic) components, the requirements of the Leather Standard are combined with those of the Standard 100. Certification according to the Leather Standard is valid for one year.

The Leather Standard defines the same four product classes as the Standard 100. Both also employ very similar catalogues of limit values for potentially harmful chemicals.

=== Oeko-Tex Organic Cotton ===
Fashion and textile products with the Organic Cotton label are made with organic cotton, grown without GMOs (genetically modified organisms) or pesticides, and were tested for other harmful substances. For the label, Oeko-Tex developed a method that can test quantitatively for genetically modified organisms. For verification of organic origin, Oeko-Tex’s GMO quantification method differentiates between contamination and purposeful mixing of conventional cotton. The certification works in compliance with several regulations including EU REACH Annex XIV and XVII, US CPSIA (lead) and EU POP regulation. The Oeko-Tex standards are modeled after the organic cotton standards by IFOAM – Organics International.

== Institutes ==
The following institutes belong to the International Association for Research and Testing in the Field of Textile Ecology (Oeko-Tex):

- Aitex – Spanish Textile Research Centre (Spain),
- Centexbel – Belgian Textile Research Centre (Belgium),
- Centrocot – Centro Tessile Cotoniero e Abbigliamento S.p.A. (Italy),
- Citeve – Centro Tecnológico das Indústrias Têxtil e do Vestuário de (Portugal),
- DTI – Danish Technological Institute (Denmark),
- FILK Freiberg Institute (Germany),
- Hohenstein Institute (Germany),
- IFTH – Institut Français du Textile et de l'Habillement (France),
- Innovatext – Textile Engineering and Testing Institute (Hungary),
- IW Textile Research Institute – Instytut Włókiennictwa (Poland),
- Mirtec, Materials Industrial Research & Technology Center (Greece),
- Nissenken Quality Evaluation Center (Japan),
- ÖTI – Institut für Ökologie, Technik und Innovation GmbH (Austria),
- Shirley Technologies Limited (United Kingdom),
- Rise IVF AB – Research Institutes of Sweden (Sweden),
- Testex AG (Switzerland),
- Vutch-Chemitex (Slovakia).

== Bibliography ==
- De Smet, D.; Weydts, D.; Vanneste, M. (2015). "Environmentally friendly fabric finishes". In Blackburn, Richard (ed.). Sustainable Apparel: Production, Processing and Recycling. Elsevier. ISBN 9781782423393
- Zippel, Erich (1999). "Oeko-Tex Labelling of Textiles". In Horrocks, A. R. (ed.). Ecotextile '98: Sustainable Development. Woodhead Publishing. ISBN 978-1855734265
