= Amann & Söhne =

German textile industry company

Amann & Söhne GmbH & Co KG

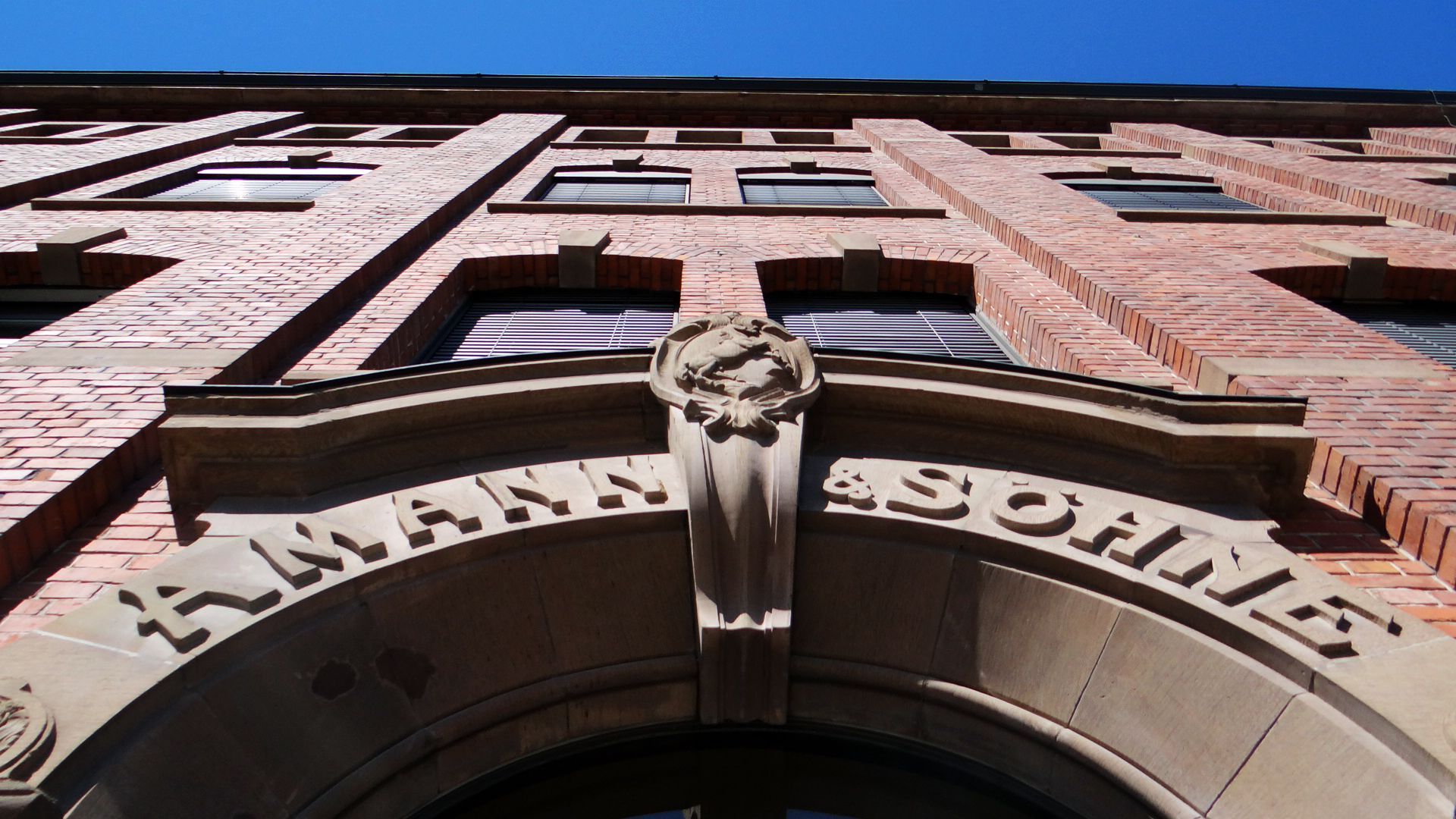
- Headquarter entrance in Bönnigheim
- Type: GmbH & Co KG
- Industry: Textile industry
- Founded: 1854; 172 years ago
- Headquarters: Bönnigheim, Germany
- Key people: Executive Board: Markus Nicolaus (CEO), Christine Bauer (CCO), Peter Morgalla (COO)
- Revenue: €225 million
- Number of employees: 2,800 (2025)
- Website: www.amann.com

Amann & Söhne (AMANN) is a German manufacturer of industrial sewing threads and embroidery yarns, headquartered in Bönnigheim that operates factories in a number of countries and provides products worldwide.

As of 2010, AMANN was the market leader in the industrial sector in Germany and internationally, AMANN was among the world's three largest producers. In 2025, the company had a turnover of approximately 230 million euros and employed 2,700 people. The daily production output amounts to approximately 1 million kilometers of thread.

== History ==
The company was founded in 1854 by Alois Amann and Imanuel Böhringer as Amann & Böhringer for the purpose of manufacturing twined and colored silk.

At that time, industrialisation had not yet reached Bönnigheim. In the beginning, the products were dyed in Rau in Berg and then returned to Bönnigheim, where they were revised and reeled on a winch by 12 employees. The force was generated by two wheel movers, who wearily turned the flywheel. The power of these men became insufficient when the company acquired new machines. Hence, they got replaced by two donkeys (later two oxen), who propelled the winch. In 1856, the company acquired new twisting machines, as well as further machines. The new machines could be propelled by a 4 HP steam engine so that the oxen got replaced.

The prosperous company developed fast and turned into a factory. This encouraged the founders to invest in a steam engine with a steam boiler and further modern machines. In 1858, Amann & Böhringer already counted 100 employees. By implementing an own dye-house, Alois Amann became a pioneer in processing silk threads in Germany.

In a Württemberg industrial biography that was released in Leipzig in 1879, the company was described as the most important and most powerful silk processing company in Germany. In 1880, the major competitive Augsburg-based factory Payr & Mayer was acquired with its subsidiary in Mössingen and the whole management got relocated to the headquarters in Bönnigheim. In 1882, Imanuel Böhringer left the company. Alois Amann converted it into a family business and hired his sons Emil and Alfred as associates. Accordingly, the company was renamed into Amann & Söhne.

Emil Amann conducted experiments with the production of synthetic fibres, however he came to the conclusion that there was nothing equivalent that could replace natural silk, yet. In the 1880s, the company expanded to Northern Italy and opened two factories in Seriate and Telgate. Emil Amann travelled to the furthest European countries in order to increase the turnover of the factories, whereas his father and brother focused on managing the company. During the following years, Alfred Amann did an apprenticeship as a dyer in Lyon, London and Krefeld. He returned to Bönnigheim in 1888 and took over the technical director's position.

In 1892, Alois Amann died at the age of 68. Henceforth, his sons Emil and Alfred started to lead the company on their own. In 1902, the old factory building in Bönnigheim was pulled down and gave space for the construction of a new factory building. Today, the building from 1902 is under monumental protection and is still used as the headquarters of AMANN Group.

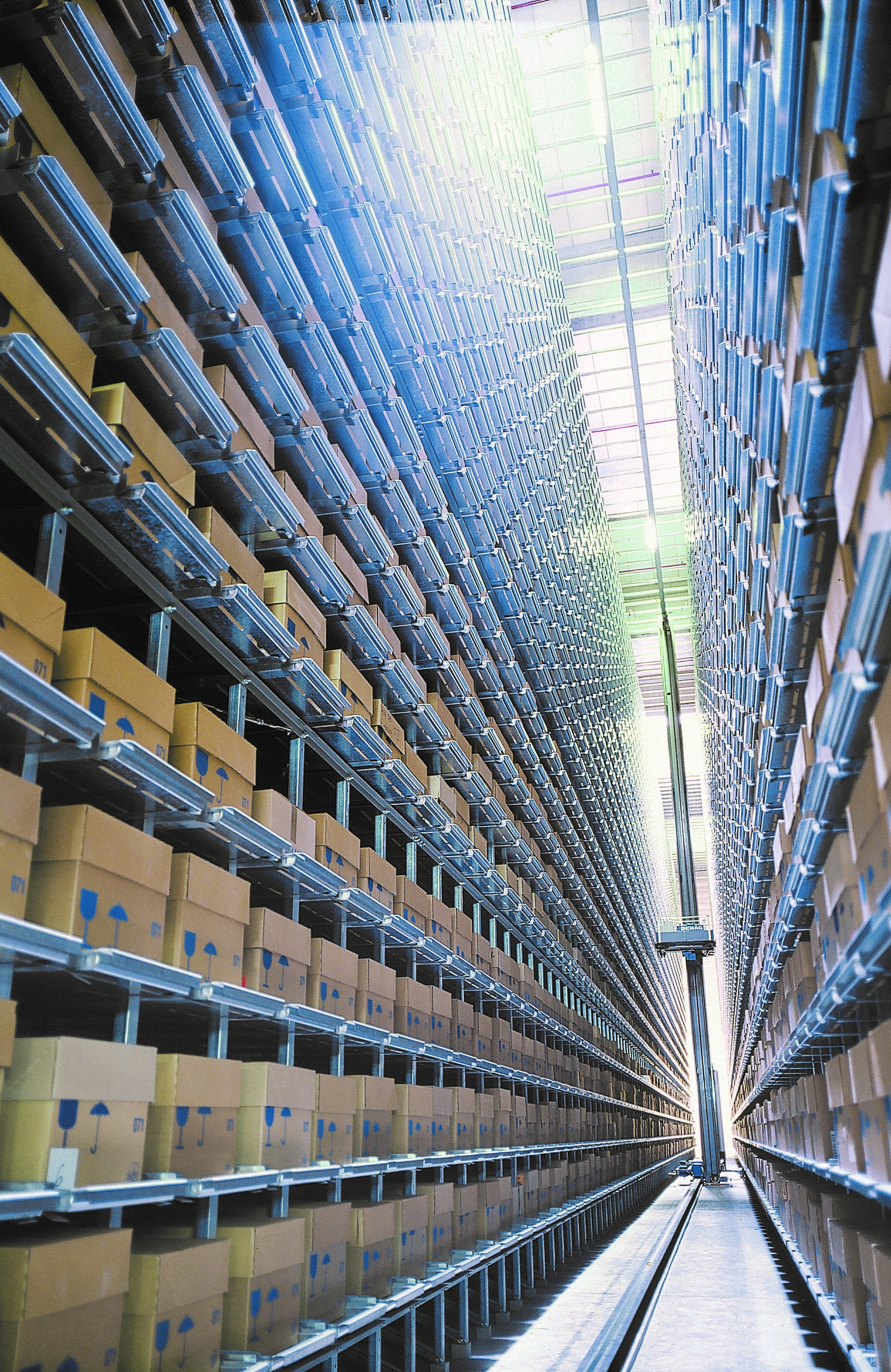
High-bay warehouse in the central industrial warehouse in Erligheim

Since silk, the original product, was gradually being replaced by more modern raw materials, Amann & Söhne started to manufacture schappe silk in 1919, and mercerised cotton in 1923.

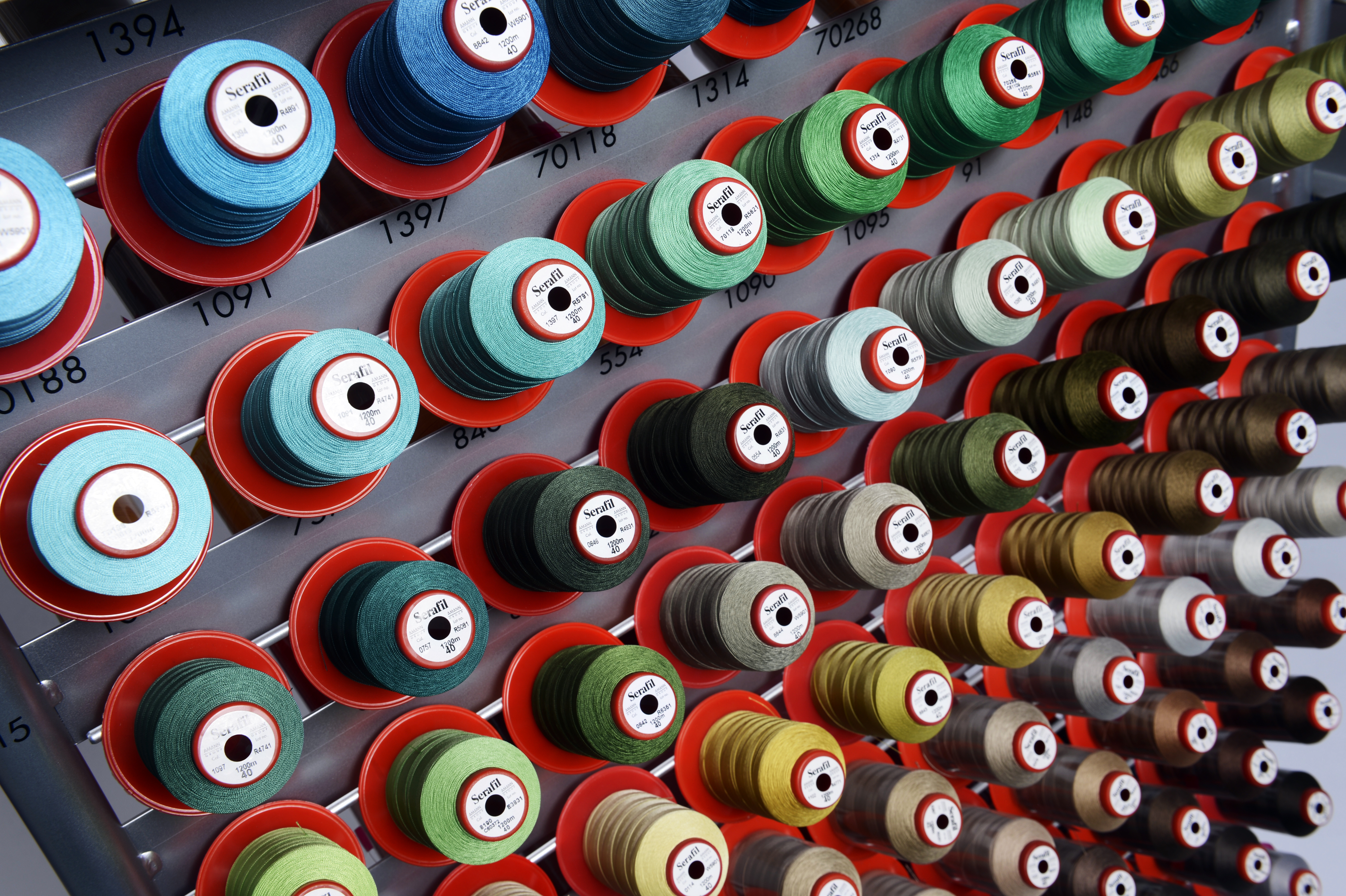
Serafil samples

Alfred Amann died in 1942. Alfred Pielenz, his son-in-law, was nominated to become his successor. He guided the company through the last years of war, during which the production stagnated, as well as through the postwar years, during which the production was slowly being reconstructed.

In 1955, the Bönnigheim-based company pioneered with the production of endless synthetic sewing threads.

In 1993/1994, AMANN acquired Ackermann-Göggingen AG, a traditional Augsburg-based company along with its dye-house. Moreover, in 1996 a fully automatic industrial central warehouse was inaugurated in Erligheim.

In 2002, AMANN extended its product portfolio and launched a novel specialty program for technical textiles.

Hanns A. Pielenz, Alfred Pielenz' son, retired in 2004 after 36 years of being the executive manager. Bodo Th. Bölzle was nominated to become his successor. In 2006, the company opened a new production plant in Brasov, Romania.

In 2008, Oxley Thread Ltd., one of the most famous European sewing thread manufactures was acquired by AMANN. In 2009, AMANN established a new production plant in Yancheng, China. Furthermore, the company launched a new label including products made of recycled polyester and organic cotton in 2009.

In 2013, the company expanded to Bangladesh and opened a new production plant in the capital Dhaka.

In 2016, AMANN inaugurated its new R&D center, the AMANN Innovation Lab, based in Augsburg. In 2017, AMANN inaugurated its Sewing Technology Center, which is based in the AMANN headquarters in Bönnigheim.

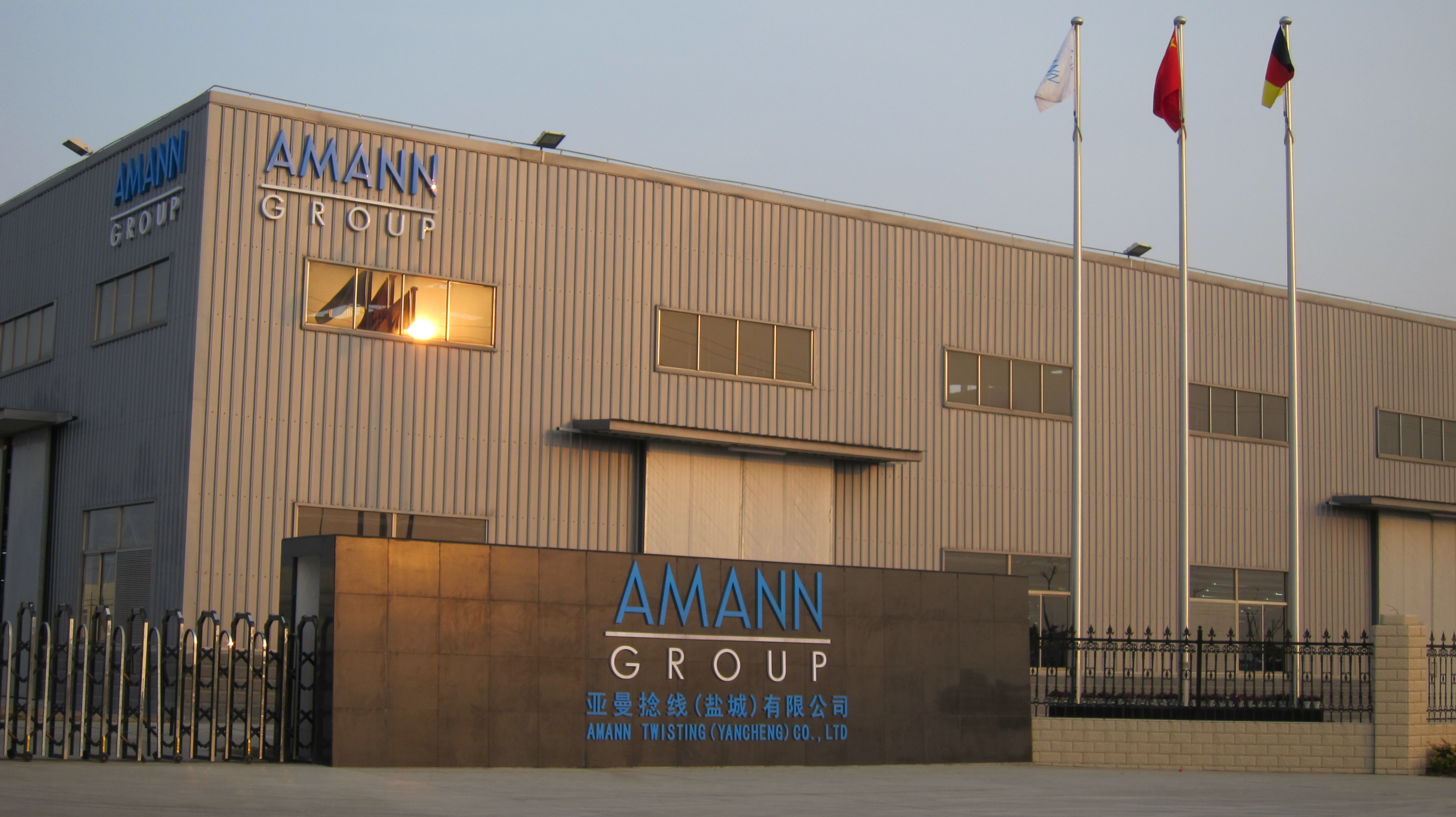
AMANN production site in Yancheng, China

In the Vietnamese coastal city of Đà Nẵng, AMANN opened its third production site on Asian soil in 2019. This plant will primarily produce sewing threads for the apparel and footwear industry. Furthermore, AMANN joined the UN Global Compact in 2019 and published its first Sustainability Report.

In early 2020, AMANN launched its new sustainable product range. This consists of the Recycled line, sewing threads made from 100% recycled PET bottles, and the Cradle to Cradle GOLD certified Lifecyce line. Moreover, Lifecycle Polyamide became the world's first recycled polyamide sewing thread. In 2020, AMANN was announced as one of the TOP 50 Sustainability & Climate Leaders by United Nations. The organization recognized AMANN's special global efforts in terms of sustainability, e.g. specifically mentioning that the AMANN Bangladesh production site “was the first plant to achieve GRS certification by following best practices with regards to safety, service and quality – utilising sophisticated machinery to produce sewing and embroidery thread for the fashion industry.”

In 2024, Amann opened its first Indian production facility in Ranipet, in the southern Indian state of Tamil Nadu. In 2025, Markus Nicolaus took over as the Group’s new CEO.

In 2026, the AMANN Knowledge Hub—a digital knowledge platform of the Amann Group—got released, providing expert information, application knowledge, industry insights, and technical content related to sewing and embroidery threads as well as textile applications.

Amann currently has approximately 2,800 employees in more than 100 countries, including production sites, subsidiaries and distribution partners. In 2025, the Amann Group's Executive Board consists of Markus Nicolaus (CEO), Christine Bauer (CCO) and Peter Morgalla (COO). Through the Amann Group, the company remains owned by the Pielenz family and the Hanns A. Pielenz Foundation.

== Products ==
The product range comprises, among others, traditional sewing threads for the apparel industry, threads for the automotive industry, and special threads for technical applications. The company is ISO 9001 and ISO 14001 certified.

== Production sites ==
The headquarters of AMANN are located in Bönnigheim/Erligheim.

- Bönnigheim (Headquarters)
- Erligheim (industrial central warehouse)

AMANN solely produces in its own production sites in:

- Manchester, United Kingdom
- Brasov, Romania
- Chribska, Czech Republic
- Yancheng, China
- Dhaka, Bangladesh
- Tam Ky, Vietnam
- Ranipet, India

Moreover, AMANN has own subsidiaries in 21 countries and sales agencies in more than 100 countries.

== Management/Amann family ==
Alois Amann (03.07.1824 – 28.09.1892) founded the company with Imanuel Böhringer (1822–1906) and led it until he died in 1892.

Emil Amann (01.03.1862 – 30.01.1935) and Alfred Amann (20.09.1863 – 01.02.1942) had already been involved as associates when their father Alois died. Later, they became the sole managers. Whilst Emil Amann retired in 1917, Alfred Amann led the company independently until he died in 1942. Especially Alfred Amann is today considered to be the crucial person in the company's history. He and his wife Jule were known to be important social patrons within their local area. Today's Gymnasium (secondary School) in Bönnigheim is named "Alfred-Amann-Gymnasium". Moreover, there is a path called "Alfred-Amann-Weg" in Bönnigheim, as well as further important buildings and facilities that where established by Alfred Amann and his wife. Alois, Alfred and Emil Amann are honorary citizens of the city of Bönnigheim.

The son-in-law of Alfred Amann, Alfred Pielenz (05.09.1898 – 12.07.1989), led the company from 1942 till 1968. He was then replaced by his son Hanns A. Pielenz (22.11.1939 – 13.06.2013), who handed over the CEO position to the former CEO, Bodo Th. Bölzle, in 2004. Today's management consists of Wolfgang Findeis, Ivo Herzog, Peter Morgalla and Arved Westerkamp.

== Literature ==
- Jörg Alexander Mann: Die Villa des Fabrikanten Alfred Amann in Bönnigheim: Ein Landhaus im Chalet-Stil als Beispiel der malerischen Architektur in Württemberg an der Wende vom 19. zum 20. Jahrhundert. Dissertation, Fakultät für Architektur, Universität Karlsruhe, 2007. Page seqq. (PDF).
