= Bönnigheim =

- Town
- Coat of arms

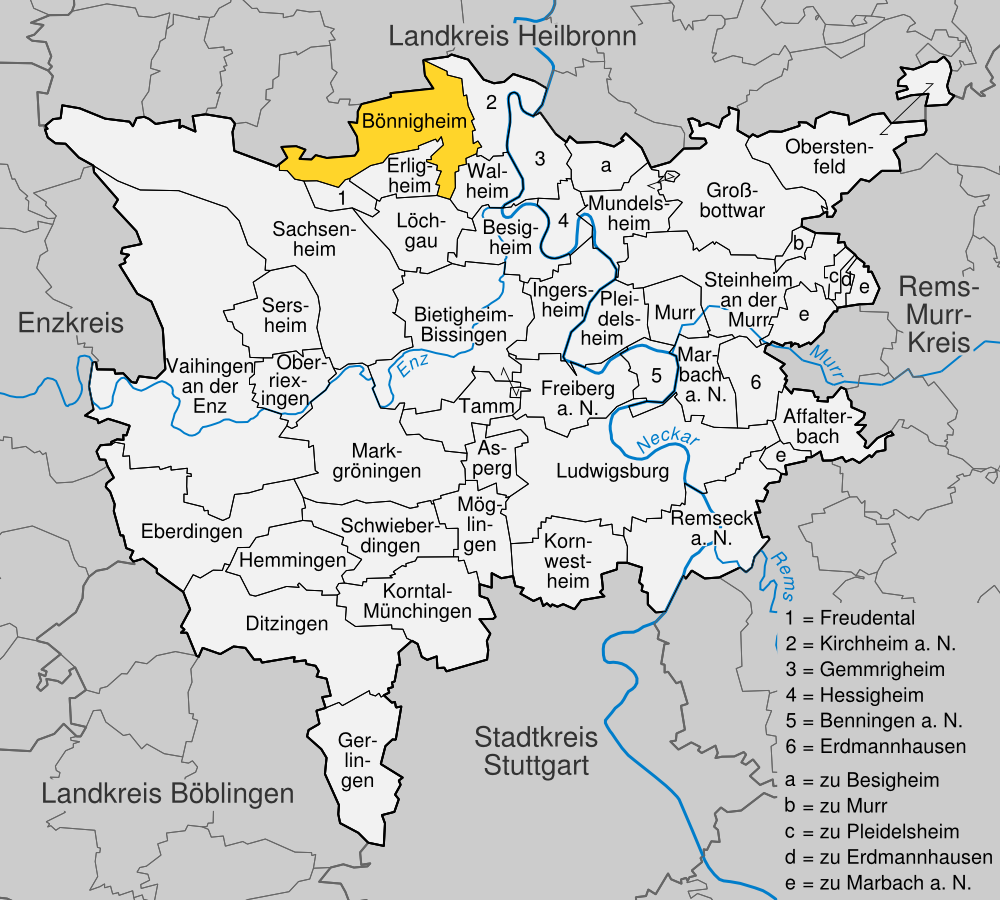
- Location of Bönnigheim within Ludwigsburg district
- Interactive map of Bönnigheim
- Location within Germany Location within Baden-Württemberg
- Coordinates: 49°02′28″N 9°05′42″E
- Country: Germany
- State: Baden-Württemberg
- Admin. region: Stuttgart
- District: Ludwigsburg
- Subdivisions: 3

Government
  - Mayor (2018–26): Albrecht Dautel

Area
  - Total: 20.13 km^{2} (7.77 sq mi)
- Elevation: 221 m (725 ft)

Population (2025-12-31)
  - Total: 8,193
  - Density: 407.0/km^{2} (1,054/sq mi)
- Time zone: UTC+01:00 (CET)
  - Summer (DST): UTC+02:00 (CEST)
- Postal codes: 74357
- Dialling codes: 07143
- Vehicle registration: LB
- Website: www.boennigheim.de

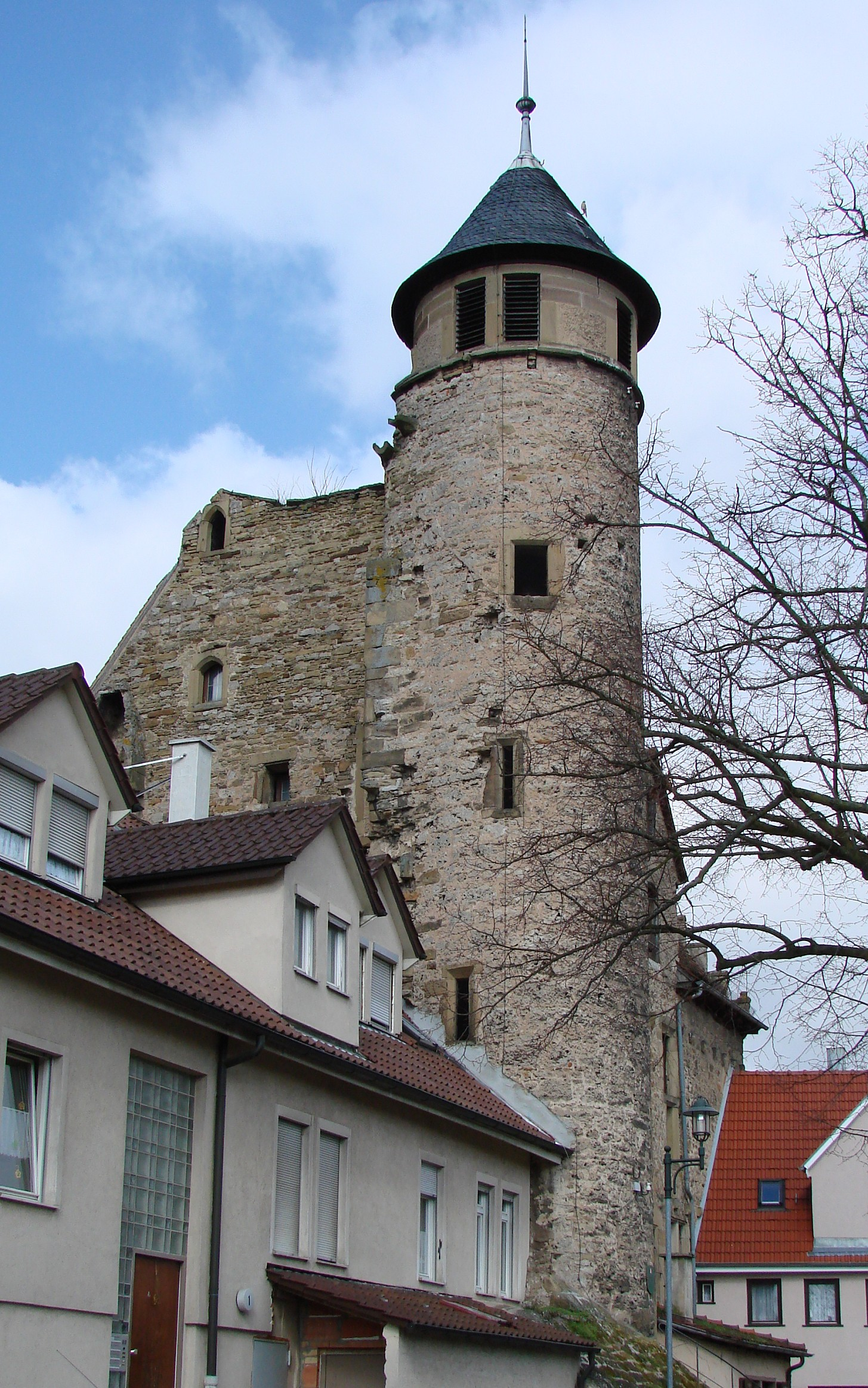
Ruin of the Ganerbenburg

Bönnigheim (German pronunciation: [ˈbœnɪçhaɪm] or [ˈbœnɪkhaɪm]) is a town in the German administrative district (Kreis) of Ludwigsburg which lies at the edge of the areas known as Stromberg and Zabergäu. The nearest large towns are Ludwigsburg and Heilbronn.

== Geography ==
The town includes the previously separate parishes of Hofen and Hohenstein. The boundaries established on 31 December 1971, saw the inclusion of the property known as the Burgermühle and the lost village of Birlingen. The former parish of Hofen now comes under the village of Hofen. In the same way, the former parish of Hohenstein now comes under the village of that name.

== History ==
The first documentary reference to Bönnigheim occurs in the Lorsch codex. In a document dated 16 February 793, the nun Hiltburg bequeathed the parishes of Bönnigheim, Erligheim and Alt-Cleebronn to the abbey of Lorsch, and it was due to this bequest that Bönnigheim fell to the bishopric of Mainz. The monastery of Hirsau later bought the village as a fief and sold it in 1284 to the monastery of Bebenhausen.

== Ganerbentum ==
In the same year, Bönnigheim was granted the status of a so-called Ganerbentum (community of joint owners), and in 1288 the fief was passed to Rudolf von Habsburg, who in turn granted it to his son, Albrecht von Löwenstein-Schenkenberg, in 1291. The estate that had emerged from the so-called Ganerbentum, which lasted until 1750, became partitioned through inheritance, marriage and purchase.

During this time the ownership of the town, which still came under the rule of the bishopric of Mainz, was subdivided between four noble families - the Lords of Sachsenheim, Liebenstein, Gemmingen and Neipperg. Each of the heirs became entitled to a quarter of the town. The same hereditary circumstances prevailed in nearby Erligheim.

It is impossible for a town to be divided into four parts without this also impinging on the life of the community. Furthermore, it is hardly surprising that such a situation should also give rise to quarrels between the heirs themselves. Accordingly, a local truce was agreed in 1388, thus giving Bönnigheim its first bylaws. Under the terms of this truce, the four heirs agreed that a so-called ‘Baumeister’ would be elected from their ranks every two years (later every three years) who would be responsible for the administration of the town. The ‘Baumeister’ took up residence in the castle. Also established as part of this agreement was the election of the town council and of the mayor, as well as the appointment of a bailiff. During the Peasants Revolt, the castle was burnt down. It was rebuilt in 1546, only to be partially torn down again in 1697. The castle remains in this latter state today.

== Modern era ==
In 1750, Earl Friedrich von Stadion purchased the town and so brought to an end the Garnerbentum era. In 1756, Bönnigheim passed to Württemberg via its purchase by Duke Carl Eugen. Here it became part of the old administrative district of Besigheim which, in turn, came under the administrative district (Landkreis) of Ludwigsburg in 1938.

== Religion ==
Apart from the Protestant and Roman Catholic congregations, the population also includes those of the New Apostolic faith.

== Incorporated parishes ==
- From 1 January 1972: Hohenstein
- From 1 January 1972: Hofen

== Governance ==
=== Town council ===
The local election held on 7 June 2009 resulted in a Council consisting of 18 members. The turnout was 54.64%. The result of the election was as follows.

FWV/CDU^{1}	8 Seats	(41,44%)
UWG^{2}	5 Seats	(27,62%)
SPD	3 Seats	(18,64%)
B90/GRÜNE	2 Seats	(12,30%)

(FWV and UWG = independents)

The chairperson of the council is the mayor.

== Arms and flag ==
Bönnigheim

The arms display, in red, a silver wheel with six spokes below which is a silver moon showing a face. The arms thus mirror the history of the town showing, as they do, elements of the Wheel of Mainz. The moon forms part of the arms of the Lords of Magenheim, who are considered to be the founders of Bönnigheim.

The town's colours are white and red and have been thus since 1921 at least.

The arms of the incorporated parishes are:

Hofen

* Hofen: In red, a silver church with a tower, above a silver double cross (two horizontal bars). The flag is white and red.

The arms and flag were approved on 7 October 1966.

Wappen Hohenstein

* Hohenstein: In silver, a red crenellated castle with twin towers on a green hill formed by a row of five diamonds. The flag is red and white.

The arms and flag were approved on 19 August 1965.

== Twin towns ==
Bönnigheim is twinned with the following towns:

- Rouffach in Alsace, France since 1964,
- Neukirch/Lausitz, Landkreis Bautzen, Saxony since 1992
- Balatonboglár am Plattensee, Hungary since 2000

== Notable buildings ==
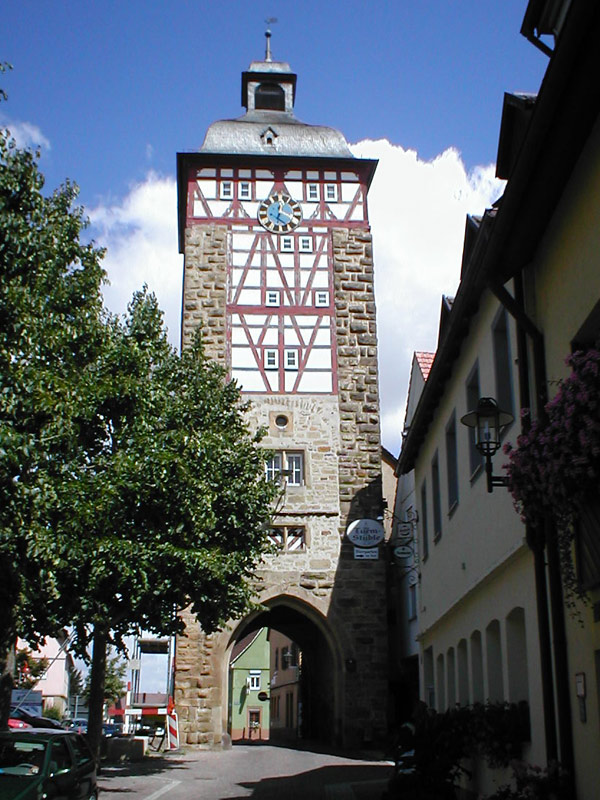
Köllesturm

The signposted tour of the town includes some 50 listed buildings.

- The Ganerbenburg (jointly owned castle) marks the north-western boundary of the town as it was in the Middle Ages. The castle was destroyed during the Peasants Revolt but subsequently rebuilt, only to be largely torn down again in the 17th century. The remains consist of a tower and a solidly built stone house. Vestiges of the old wall, which dates from the Middle Ages, can be seen to the west of the castle. The wall is 1150 metres long, up to 9.10 metres high and 1.40 metres thick.
- The Köllesturm is a gated tower, part of the 13th-century town wall. A bridge led across the dry moat to the Köllesturm; there was also a double gate and a drawbridge tower. The present roof dates back to renovation work carried out after a fire in the late 18th century.
- Der Diebsturm ('Thief's Tower') is a semi-circular tower built onto the town wall in 1458.
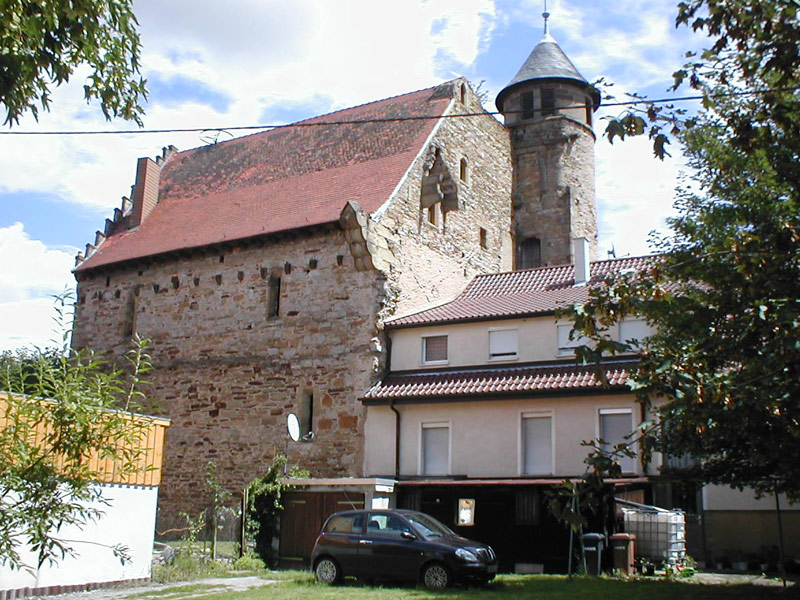
The Ganerbenburg

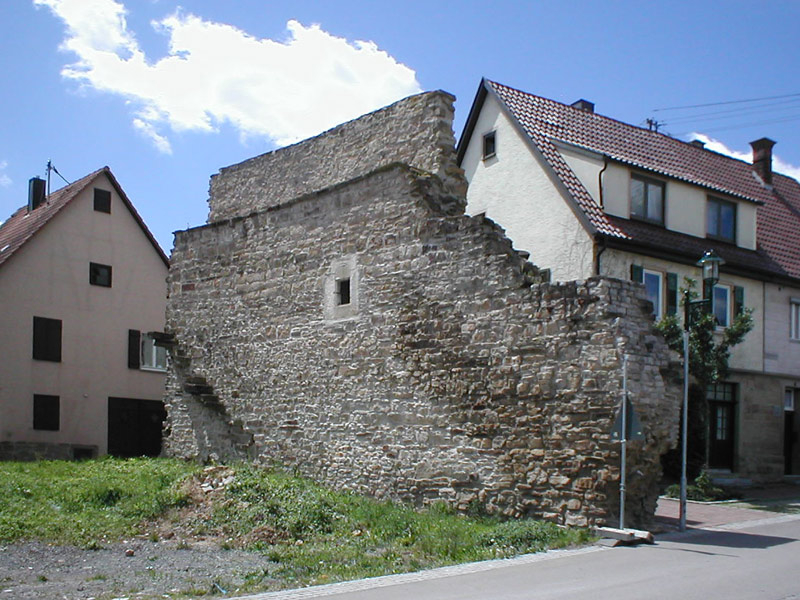
Vestiges of the town wall

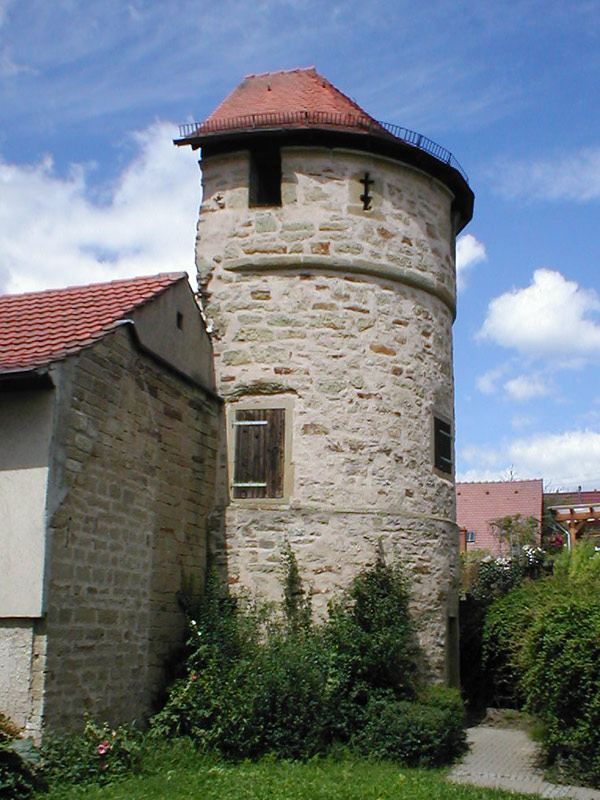
Diebsturm ('Thief's Tower)

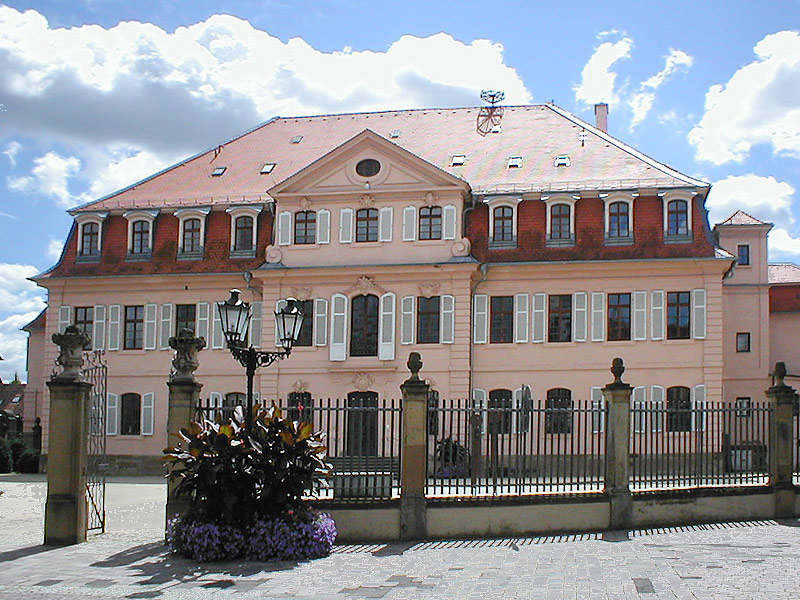
Stadionsches Schloss

- The Stadionsche Schloss was built in 1756 by the master builder Anton Haaf for Count Friedrich Stadion. It has fulfilled various functions over the years: from 1828 to 1888 it was a forestry office; later a royal institute for the deaf and mute; then the Schiller College for American students. Since 1996, it has been home to the collection of Naive Art belonging to the Museum Charlotte Zander.
- Der Kavaliersbau at the town wall with its striking stepped gable is the last vestige of the former small Liebensteiner castle. It was on this site that the Stadionsche Schloss was later built. The town's music school and the youth café are both located here.
- Das Forstgefängnis was built in the 19th century as a prison for poachers and others caught stealing in the woods and stands between the castle and the Kavaliersbau. Today it is home to the Museum Sophie La Roche.
- Der Georgsbrunnen (St George's Fountain) with the figure of Saint George fighting a dragon was erected in 1549; the basin surrounding the spout dates from 1816 and is inscribed with the names of former town councillors. This fountain, which is situated in front of the Stadionsche Schloss, served for many years as a water supply for fire-fighting.
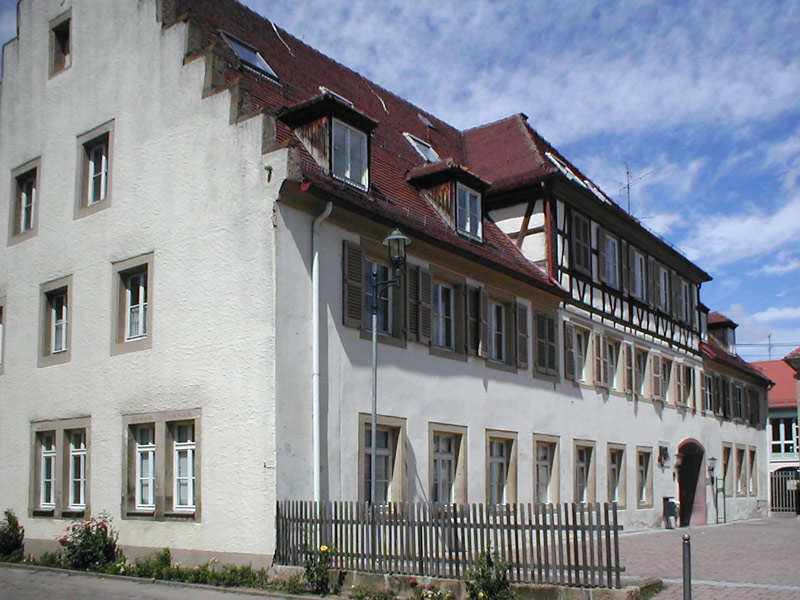
Kavaliersbau

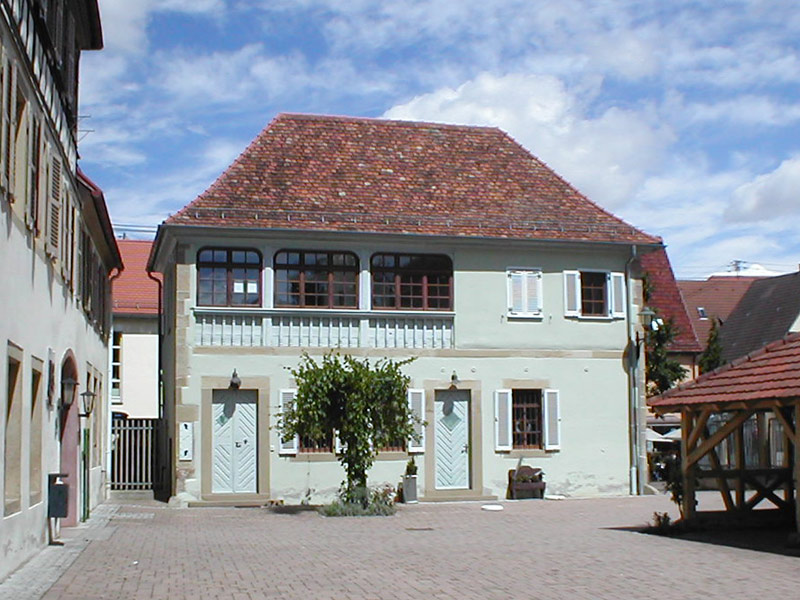
Forstgefängnis ('Forest prison')

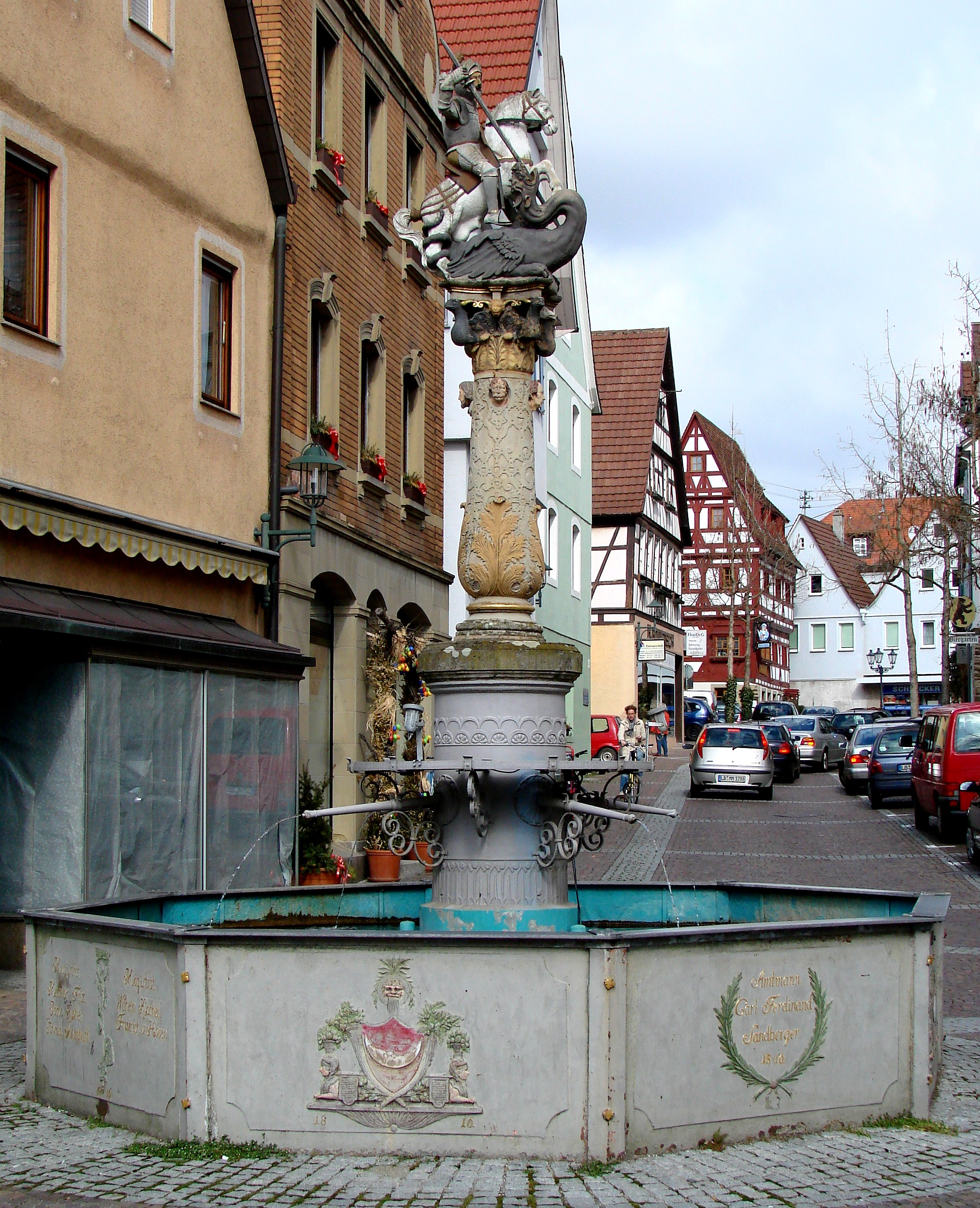
Saint George's fountain

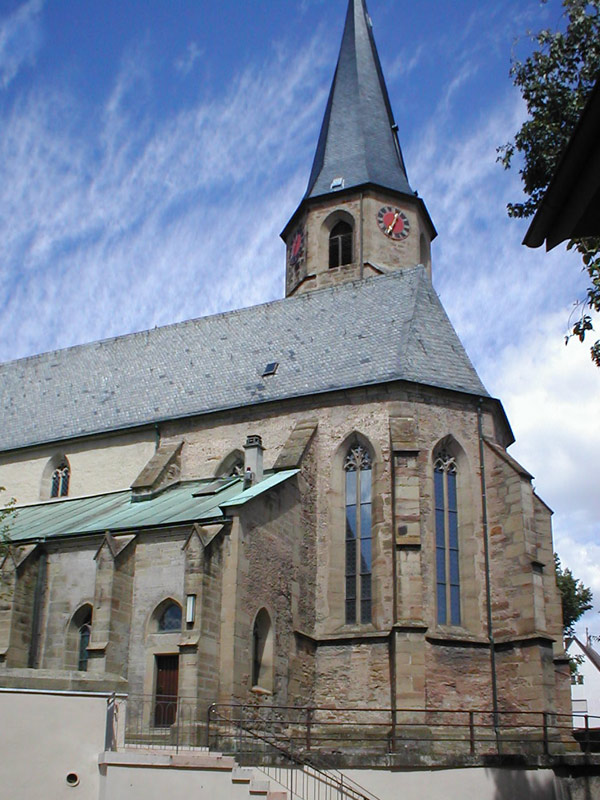
Cyriakuskirche

- The Cyriakuskirche dates from a Roman basilica; the first documentary evidence occurs in 1100.
- Also on the church square is the Cyriakuspfründehaus, which, until 1869, was the residence of the first vicar. It subsequently became the local prison. Nearby is the so-called Stelzenhaus, ('House on stilts') which has additional living accommodation in an overhanging upper floor supported on wooden posts.
- The Bebenhäuser Hof was a farm belonging to the Abbey of Bebenhausen, which was already established in Bönnigheim in 1103. The building dates from around 1620 and has a gargoyle on its roof. The paintings on its timber panelled walls show the words of contemporary songs. Renovated in 1983, the Bebenhäuser Hof is now a hotel.
- The Mainzer Hof (address Meierhof 7) is a two-storey early Gothic stone house dating from the end of the 13th century.
- The Maulbronner Hof was built in 1581 as the farm building of the Monastery of Maulbronn. It has since been converted to living accommodation and business premises.
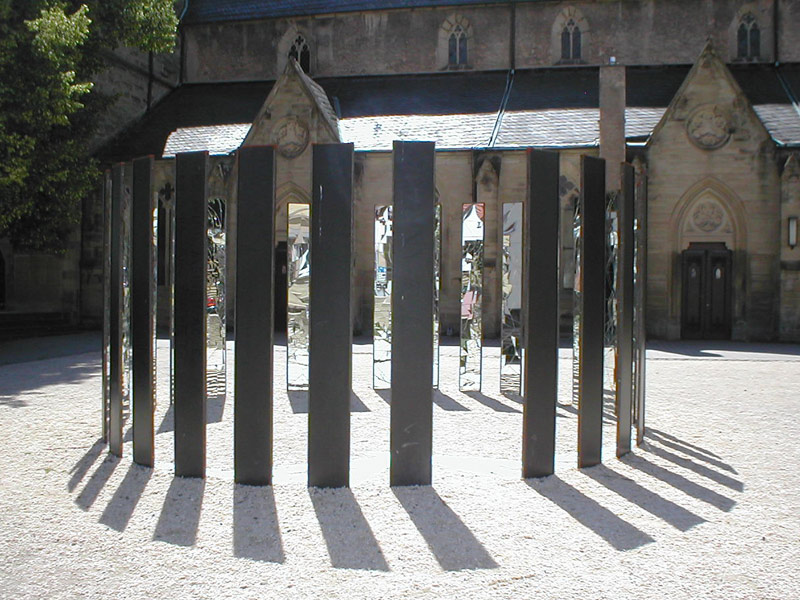
Artwork on the church square

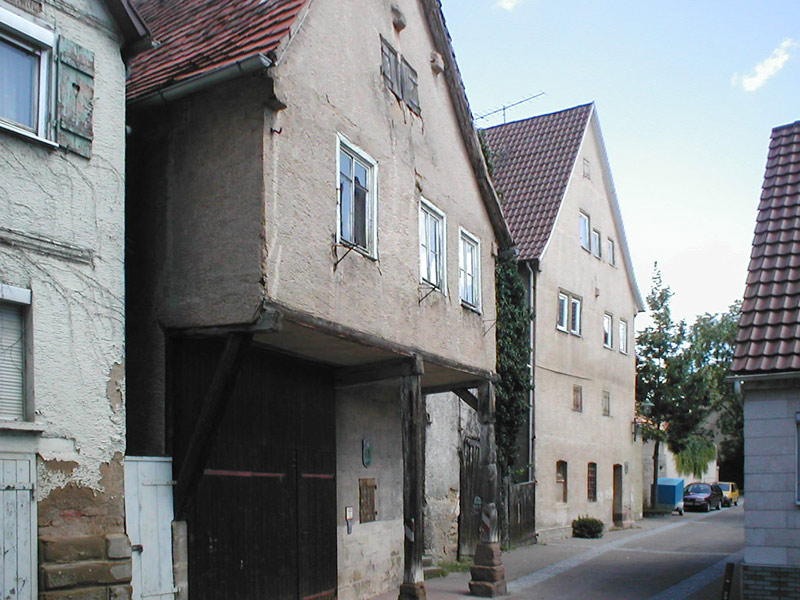
Stelzenhaus ('House on stilts') & Cyriakuspfründehaus

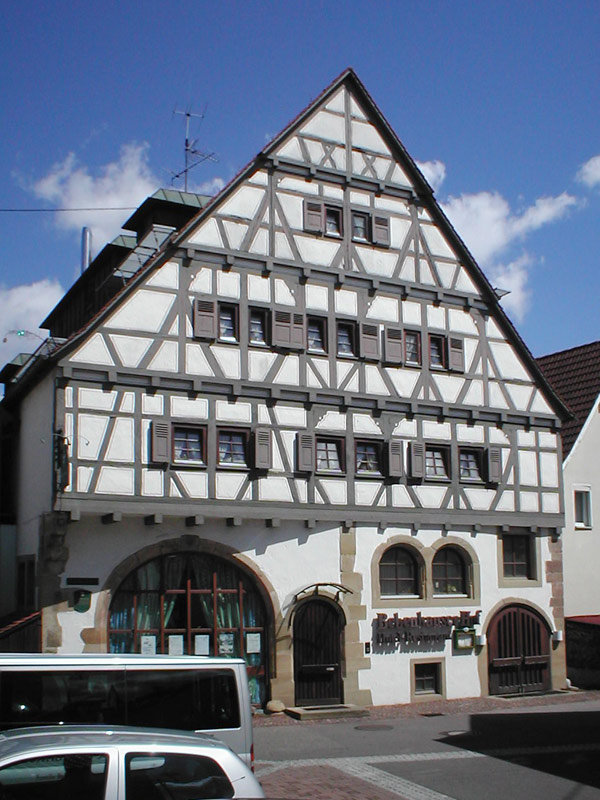
Bebenhäuser Hof

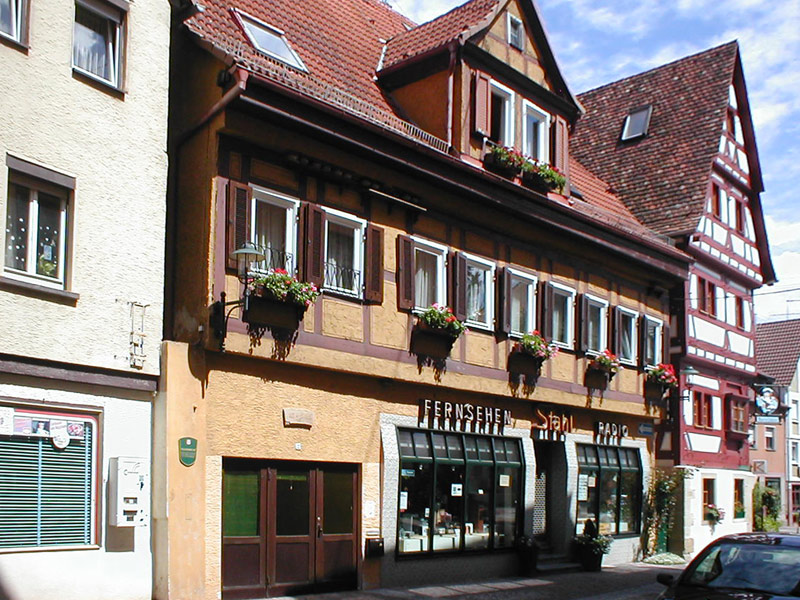
Maulbronner Hof

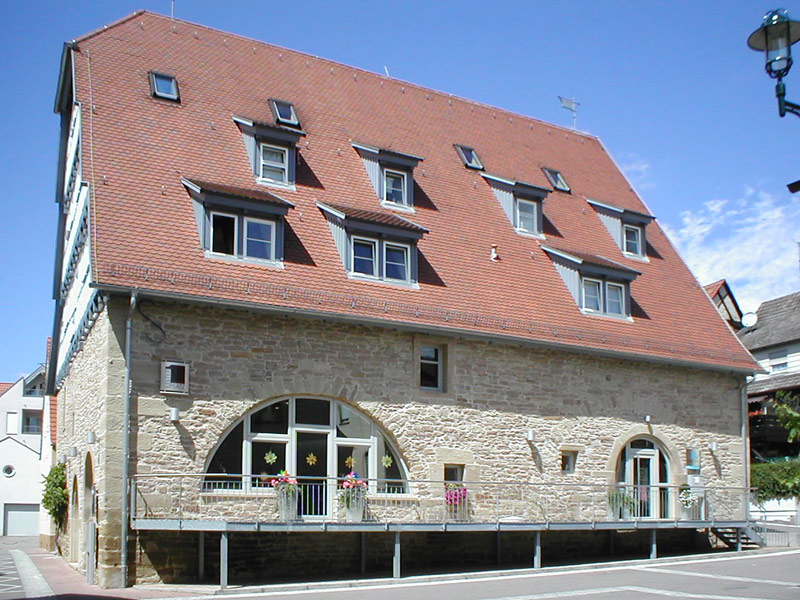
Gemminger Kelter ('Wine cellar')

- The Neipperger Kelter and the Gemminger Kelter ('Neipperg and Gemmingen wine cellars') are stone buildings dating from the year 1600. As such, they trace their origins to the Earls of Neipperg and the Counts of Gemmingen, both of whom owed a quarter of the town from the Middle Ages until the 18th century. The Gemminger Kelter was recently modernised and converted into business premises and living accommodation. The exterior of the Neipperger Kelter is yet to be restored and houses the social section of a local sports club. The two other wine cellars (Sachsenheim and Liebenstein) were demolished when the cellar of the local wine co-operative was built in 1949. The latter has a clock tower bearing the arms of the four former ruling families, but has since been converted into a supermarket.
- The former Gemminger Amtshaus ('court house') is situated near the church. Its ancient central section is now barely discernible due to the conversion of the "Amtshaus" into living accommodation and business premises.
- The Ganerbenbrunnen ('Ganerben Fountain') in the centre of the town displays the arms of the four noble 'Ganerben' families and is a reminder of its division of Bönnigheim into four sections.
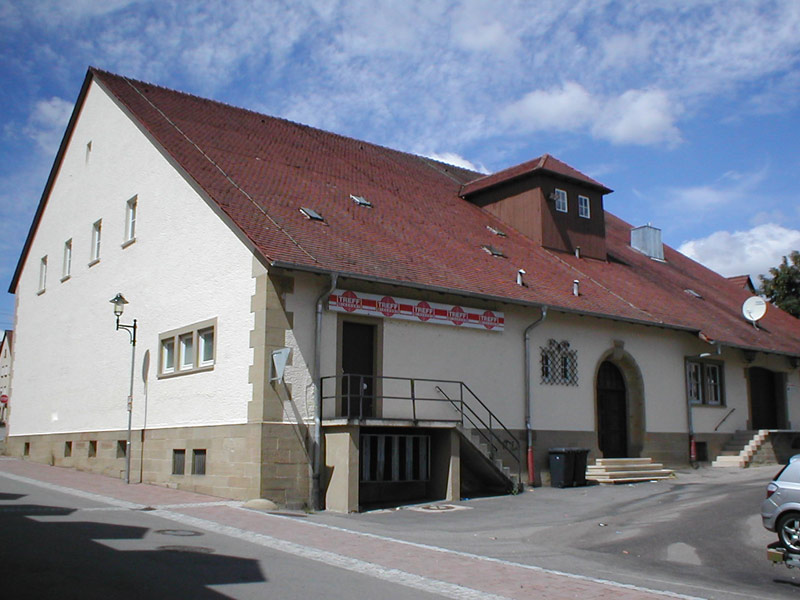
Former wine cellar of the local co-operative

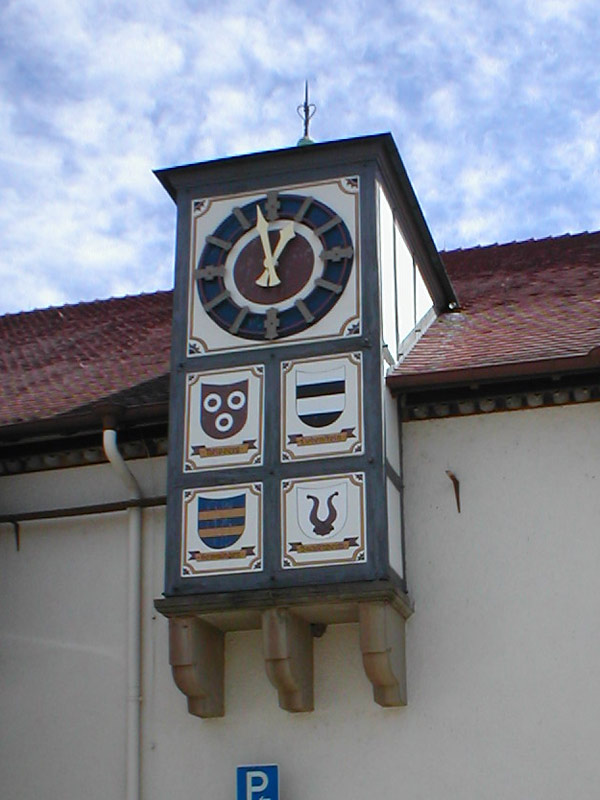
Clock tower on the former wine cellar of the co-operative

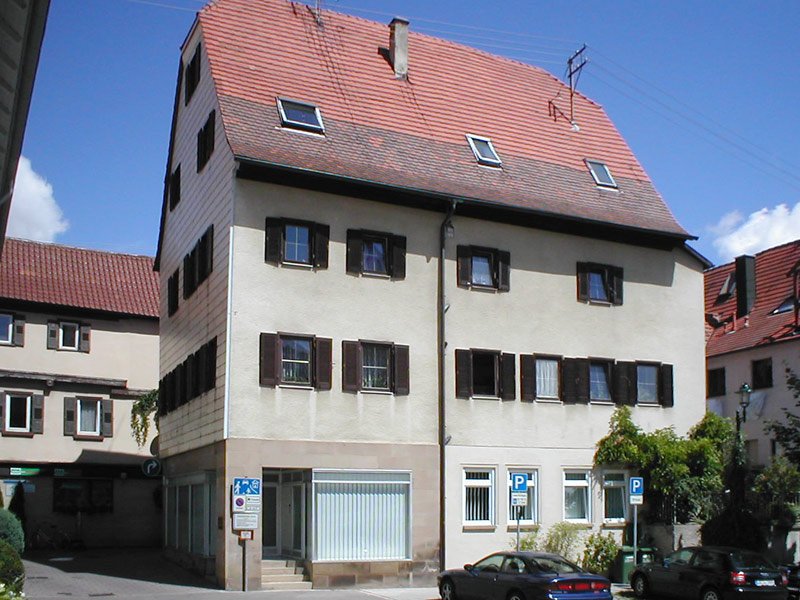
Former Gemminger Amtshaus ('court house')

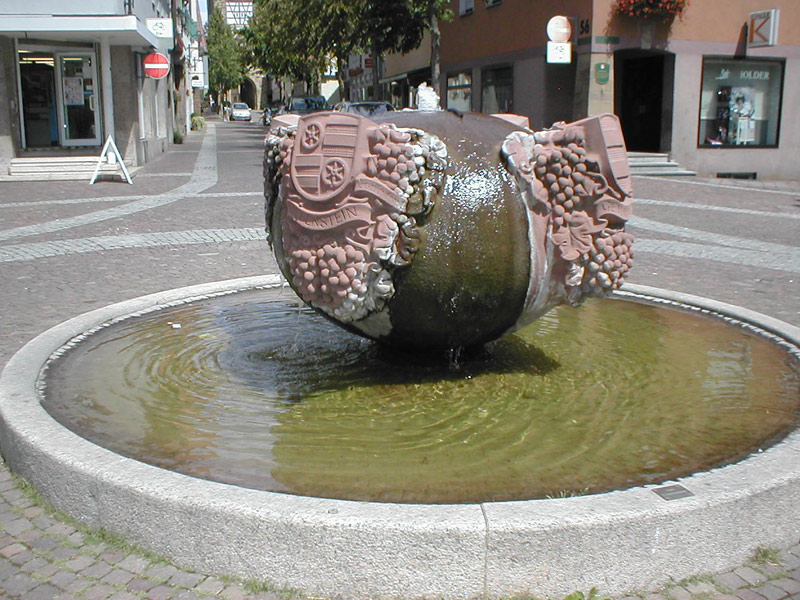
'Ganerben' fountain

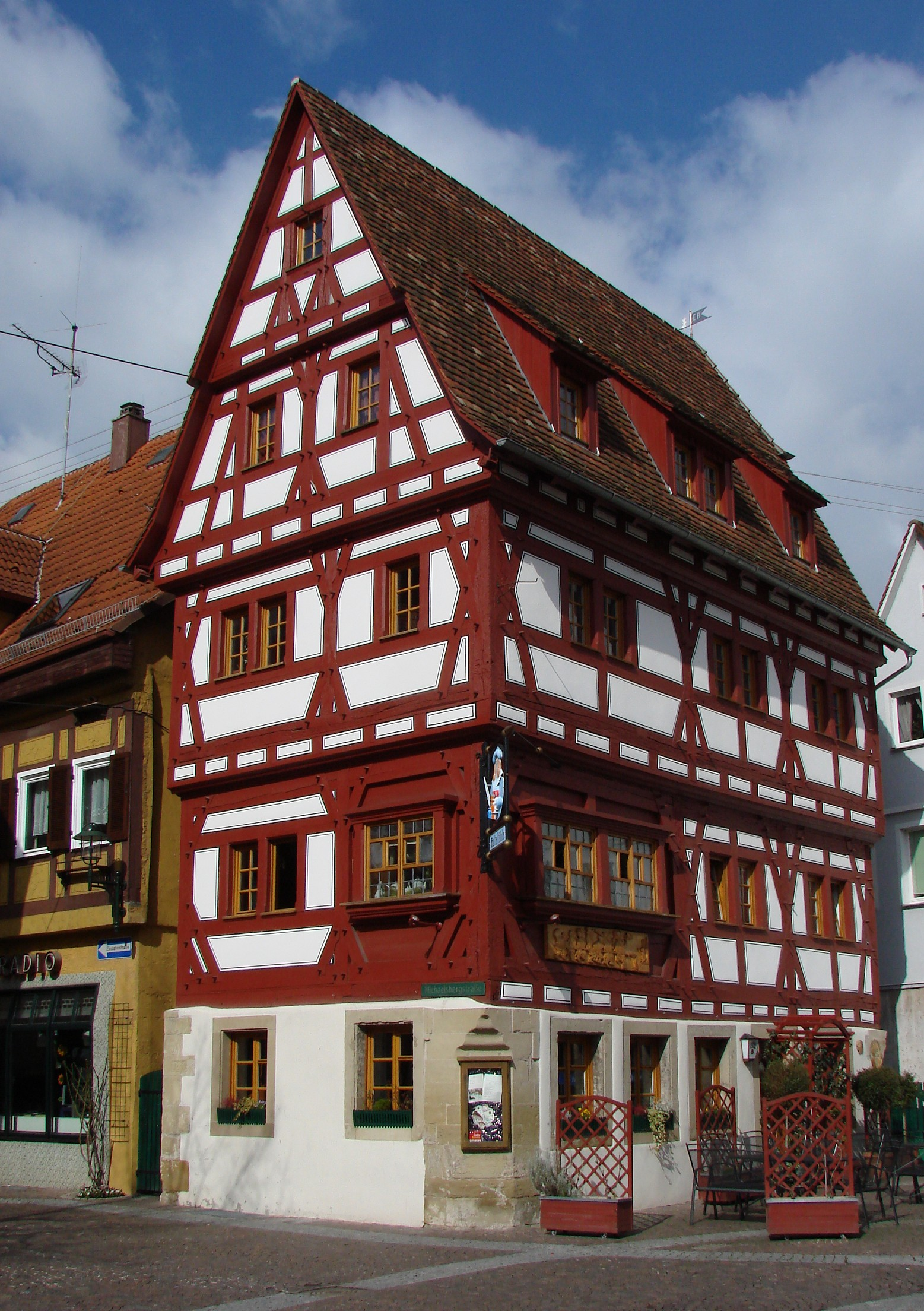
Timber-framed house on the market square

- The former Stadtschreiberhaus ('Town Clerk's house') at Kirchstraße 22 still has vestiges of late Gothic paintwork dating from 1541/42. In its garden is one of the oldest apothecaries which now houses an apothecary museum, open to the public.
- The Stadtapotheke (chemist) at Kirchgasse 2 was built in 1764 in the late baroque style. It has been home to a chemist since 1848. The main part of the old structure is visible through new shop windows.
- The town also has numerous other historic timber-framed houses. These include the old inns such as theBären, which dates from 1766. Also worthy of mention are the Weingärtnerhaus of 1810 and a private house in the Grabenstrasse, which dates from 1757; also the Ackerbürgerhaus of 1630 in the Schloßstrasse with its nine roof sections.
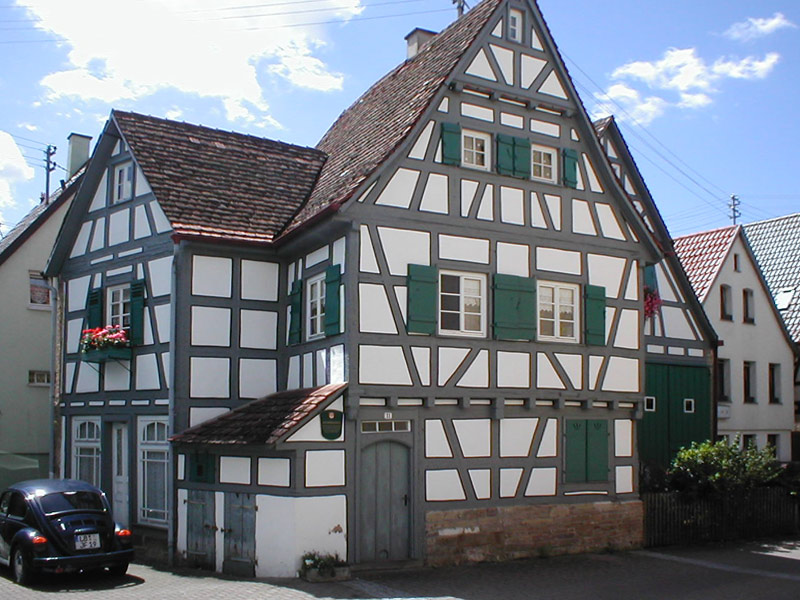
Ackerbürgerhaus 1630

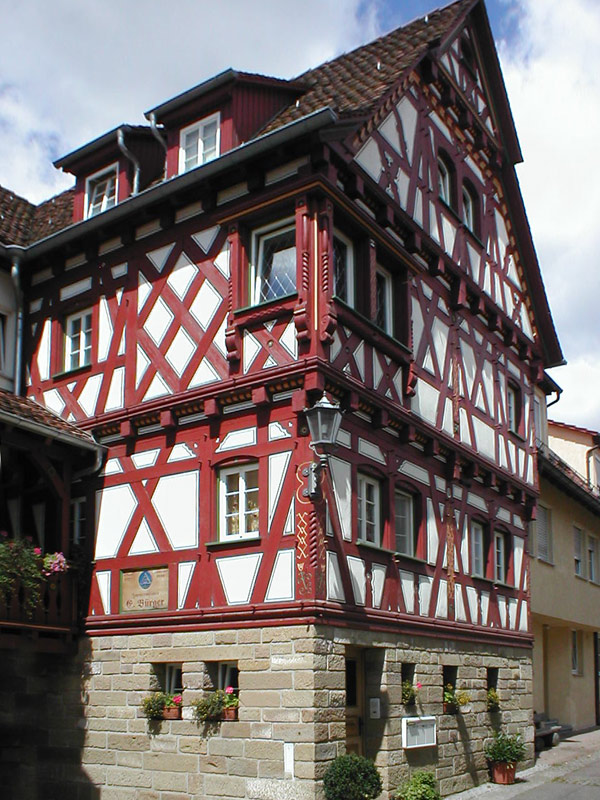
Wohnhaus 1757

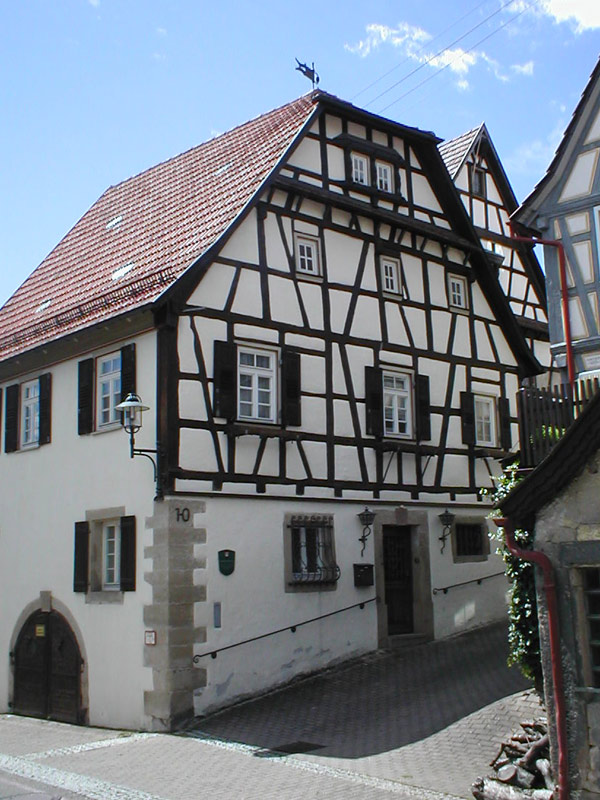
Weingärtnerhaus 1810

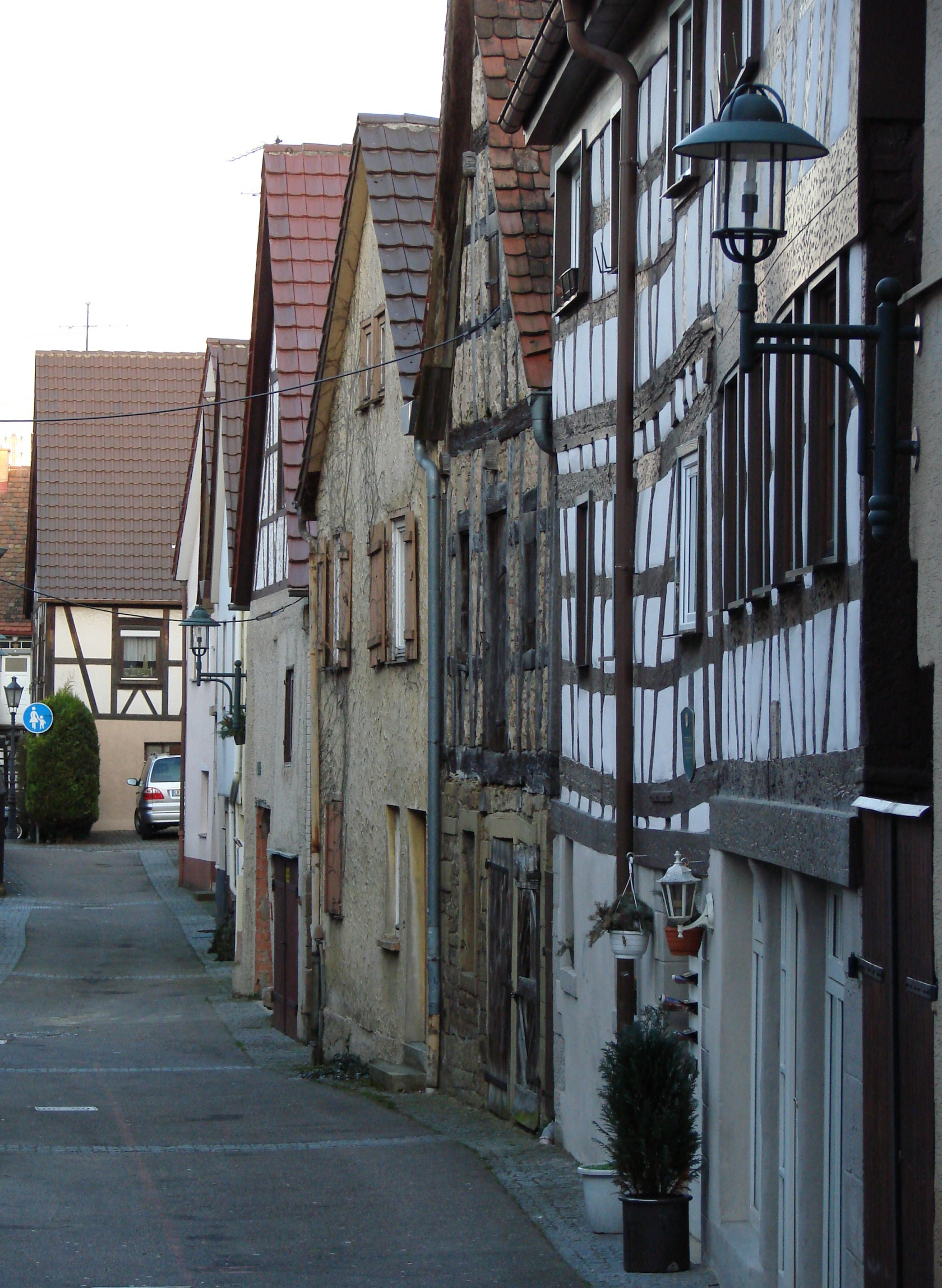
Gerbergasse

== Economy and infrastructure ==
=== Viticulture ===
Wine has been produced in Bönningheim since written records began. The Strombergkellerei is the wine-growing co-operative for Bönnigheim, Kirchheim am Neckar, Hohenhaslach and Erligheim. The vineyard of Ernst Dautel is known outside the region for quality wine, in particular for Spätburgunder und Lemberger.

=== Industry ===
==== Amann ====
The industrial age did not reach Bönnigheim until 1 November 1854, when Alois Amann (1824 – 1892) and Immanuel Böhringer (1822 – 1906) established a firm for the production of twisted and dyed silk yarns in a house which had previously been a private school for boys.

By 1 December of the same year, two winding machines and a cleaning machine were in operation, as well as a twisting-machine. The firm's modest production together with some purchased yarn was dyed at the Rau dyeing works in Berg before being taken to Bönnigheim where it was wound onto a bobbin and finished by twelve women. Two men turning a wheel provided the motive power. However, by 1855 manpower had proved insufficient and two donkeys (later two oxen) were used to drive a horse mill. In the same year, the black dyeing process was transferred in-house and additional machinery of various kinds was acquired. The following year saw the arrival of four new twisting machines, six additional winders and more washing and bobbin machines: the power source for these was a four-horsepower steam engine which replaced the oxen. In 1857, between 90 and 100 females were employed each earning 20 Gulden per year, rising to 25 Gulden after six months.

The firm flourished and expanded after the Franco-Prussian War (1870–1871) and a bigger steam engine was installed. When the firm celebrated its silver jubilee in 1879 it had become the leading German manufacturer of silk sewing threads.

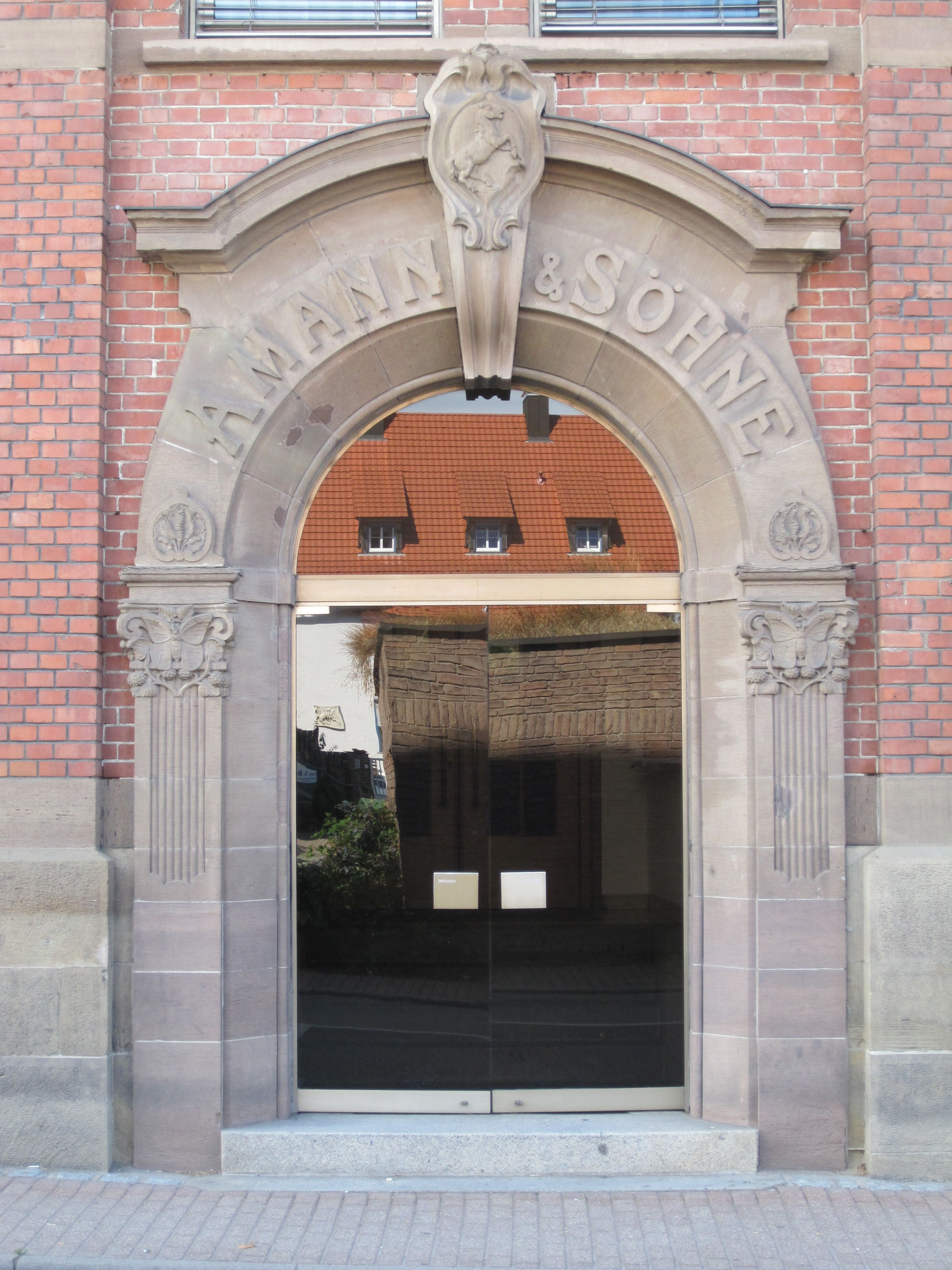
Entrance to the new building of 1902. Today the entrance to the head office of the Amann Group.

In 1880, a competitor, Payr and Mayer in Augsburg and its subsidiary in Mössingen were bought and the top management transferred to Bönnigheim. In 1882, Immanuel Böhringer retired leaving Alois Amann as the sole proprietor until he was joined by his sons, Emil Amann (1862 – 1935) and Alfred Amann (1863 – 1942), at which point the firm became known as Amann und Söhne. Emil's pioneering experiments with synthetic fibres were abandoned when he decided that there was no substitute for real silk. There was expansion abroad with the purchase of two factories at Seriate and Telgate in Northern Italy. Emil Amann travelled throughout Europe on sales missions while his father and brother concentrated on the running of the factory. Colour dyeing was transferred in-house in 1884 as there had been complaints about the single-colour dyed silk that had previously been contracted out. No river flows through Bönnigheim and so a bore hole was sunk within the factory complex in 1886 to provide water for dyeing. Alfred Amann followed apprenticeships in Lyon, London and Krefeld before returning to the firm in 1888 to take up the post of technical director. When Alois Amann died in 1892, the sons took over the business and continued in partnership until 1917 when Emil retired to Wiesbaden to live the life of a man of private means.

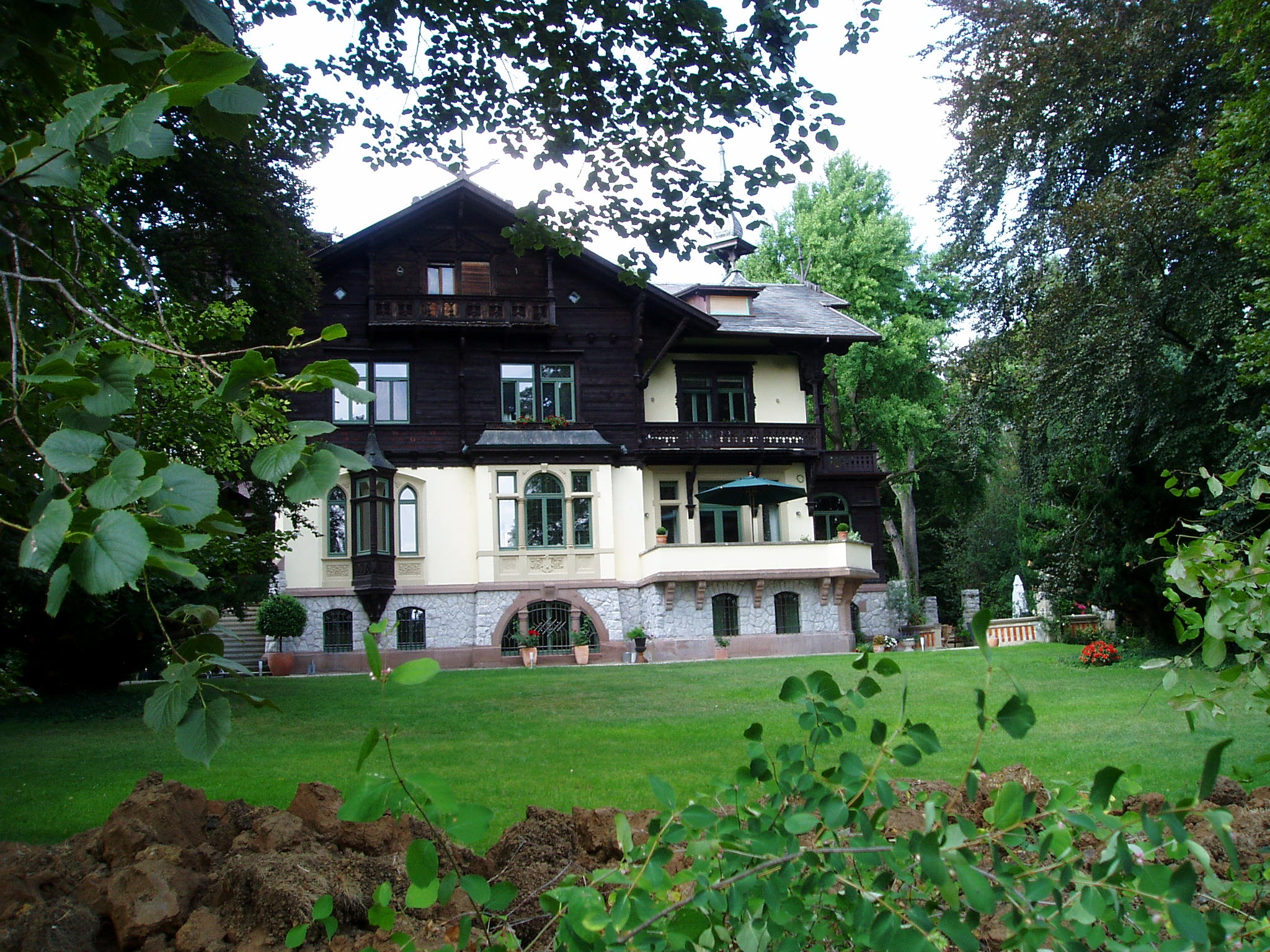
Former residence of Alfred Amann in the Kirchheimerstrasse. It was built in the 'Swiss national style' between 1899-1900 and designed by the Swiss architect, Jacques Gros.

In 1893, the fusion with Payr and Mayer was completed. The Zabergäu Railway provided good communications with Güglingen and a branch was opened in that nearby town. This, however, did not prove a success and it was closed within a relatively short time. In 1900, a new 40 – 60 horsepower steam engine was installed at the Bönnigheim plant to generate electricity for lighting. Two years later, the factory was extended.

The early years of the 20th century saw the manufacture of surgical threads which were woven rather than twisted. In 1907 a new artificial silk was produced specifically for the manufacture of Plauen lace. With the main factory unable to cope with demand, another was set up at Mundelsheim in 1910. A new product was added to the Amann range in 1919 with the manufacture of schappe silk (silk waste) and in 1921 an extension was built to house the colour dyeing plant. The latter was overseen by Johannes Mecheels, whose son, Otto Mecheels, went on to establish the Hohenstein Institute, a textile research centre situated at the edge of Bönnigheim. In 1923, mercerised cotton thread was produced, followed two years later by crocheting thread made from artificial silk.

In 1931, Alfred Pielenz, the son-in-law of Alfred Amann, became a partner, finally taking sole control of the firm when his father-in-law retired in 1933. Production became difficult during the Second World War and was finally halted. However, within a few months of the end of hostilities, manufacturing restarted although full output was not attained until 1948 when the import of raw silk was again permitted. Alfred Pielenz was responsible for a major building extension programme during the post-war years. The German economic boom brought about a significant increase in the demand for sewing threads both at home and abroad and the firm was restructured accordingly. In 1959, 90% of the output consisted of thread made from natural sources, but by the end of the 1970s, the same percentage was being produced from synthetic fibres. Massive investment was required to bring the production up to date and ensure maximum rationalisation. A number of competitors were taken over and a central warehouse was established in the nearby village of Erligheim. The 1970s also saw production transferred overseas with factories opened in South Africa, Mexico and Spain, the output of the various plants being geared to the requirements of the individual markets.

The production was transferred from Bönnigheim in recent years and most of the buildings have been demolished. The firm is now known as the Amann Group but its head office remains in the town.

Textiles, along with agriculture and printing, still form the main manufacturing base of Bönnigheim.

===== Amann family – benevolence to the town =====
Alfred Amann was known locally as the ‘soul of the town’ and gave large sums of money for the benefit of the local community. Within a year of entering the firm, Alfred, together with his mother, and brother, Emil, provided funds for a new chapel at the local cemetery which is still in use to this day. In 1902, he donated a swimming pool, which was up-dated and enlarged in 1933. In 1912, it was the turn of his former local school to benefit: a new school building was funded, thus creating for Bönnigheim its first 'Realschule' (secondary school). This was followed by a donation of 2,000 marks (ℳ) towards the education of gifted children of modest means. During the period of hyper-inflation in the Weimar Republic in 1921, Amann was the only firm in the area not to lay off workers: instead they built a track around the town's forest. More donations followed to celebrate the 50th anniversary of the firm's creation, to commemorate the death of his mother in 1913, his silver wedding in 1916 and his golden wedding in 1941. The marriage of his daughter in 1930 was marked by the gift of a new school building for the Volksschule (elementary school). An indoor sports centre was the gift of Alfred and his wife, Julie, on the occasion of his 70th birthday in 1933. It was his wish that workers be able to buy their own houses and, to this end, loans at low interest were granted to those able to prove that they had saved money. In 1933, 90 of his 128 married workers were house-owners; 16 of the 26 salaried technical staff were in the same position.

==== Hohenstein Institute ====
The Mecheels family run a worldwide textile research and training centre, the Hohenstein Institute, at a nearby castle, Schloss Hohenstein. This organisation works for the clothing industry and in the fields of textile care and hospital hygiene.

=== Media ===
The Bönnigheimer Zeitung, is the local newspaper produced by Südwest-Presse. An independent news sheet Nachrichtenblättle reporting from the town halls of Bönnigheim, Kirchheim und Erligheim is published once a week.

=== Public institutions ===
There is a retirement home and a care home, both run by Kleeblatt Pflegeheime.

== Education ==
All three sectors of the three-branch school system (Education in Germany) are present in Bönningheim: as its name implies, the Alfred Amann Gymnasium is a gymnasium. The Sophie La Roche Realschule is, of course, a realschule. The Ganerbenschule is both a grundschule and a hauptschule werkrealschule. In addition, there are three municipal nursery schools, two Protestant nursery schools and one Roman Catholic nursery school. There is also a municipal music school.

== Sons and daughters of the town ==
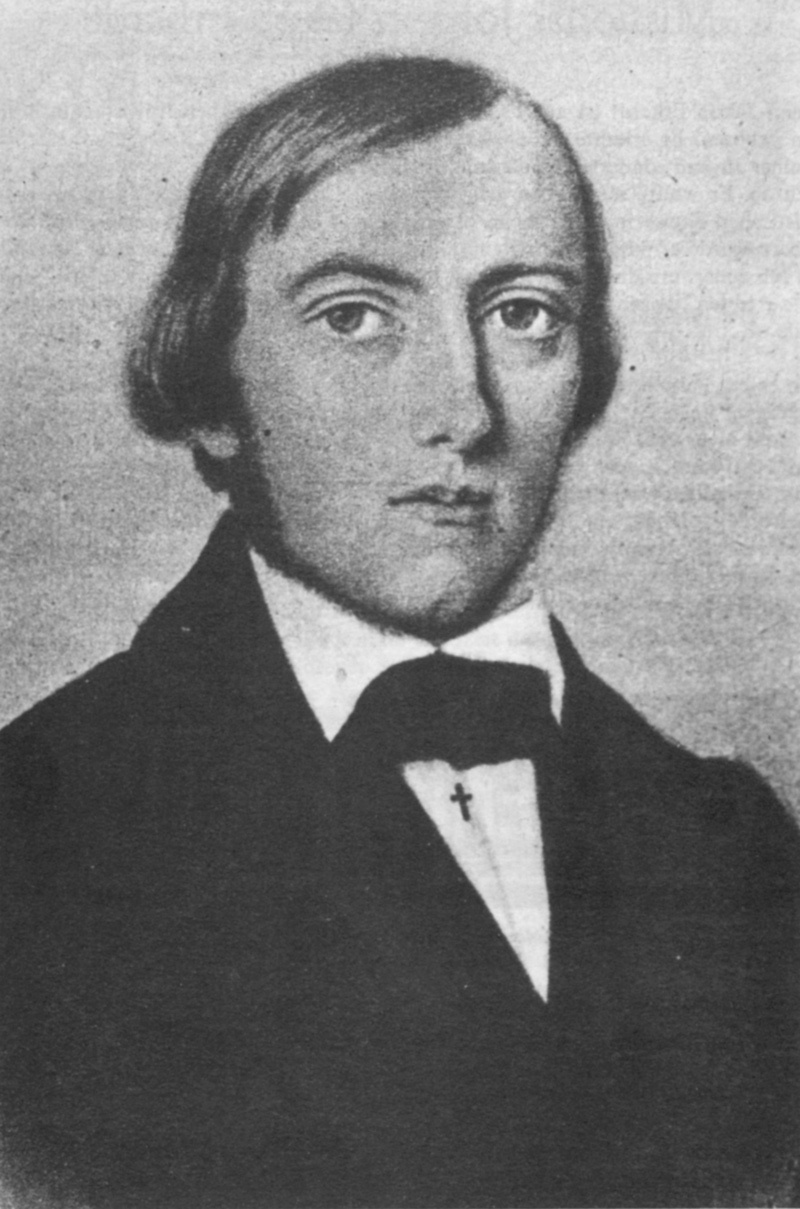
Johann Jakob Ehrhardt

- Alfred Amann (1863–1942), textile manufacturer, benefactor and honorary citizen of Bönnigheim
- Johann Jakob Erhardt (1823–1901), missionary in East Africa and India
