= Hohenstein Laboratories =

German company

Hohenstein Group
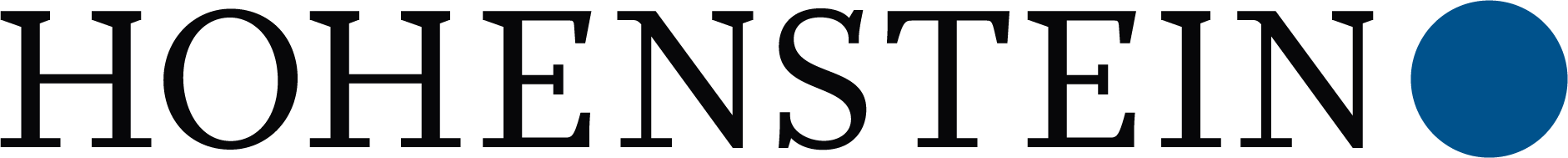

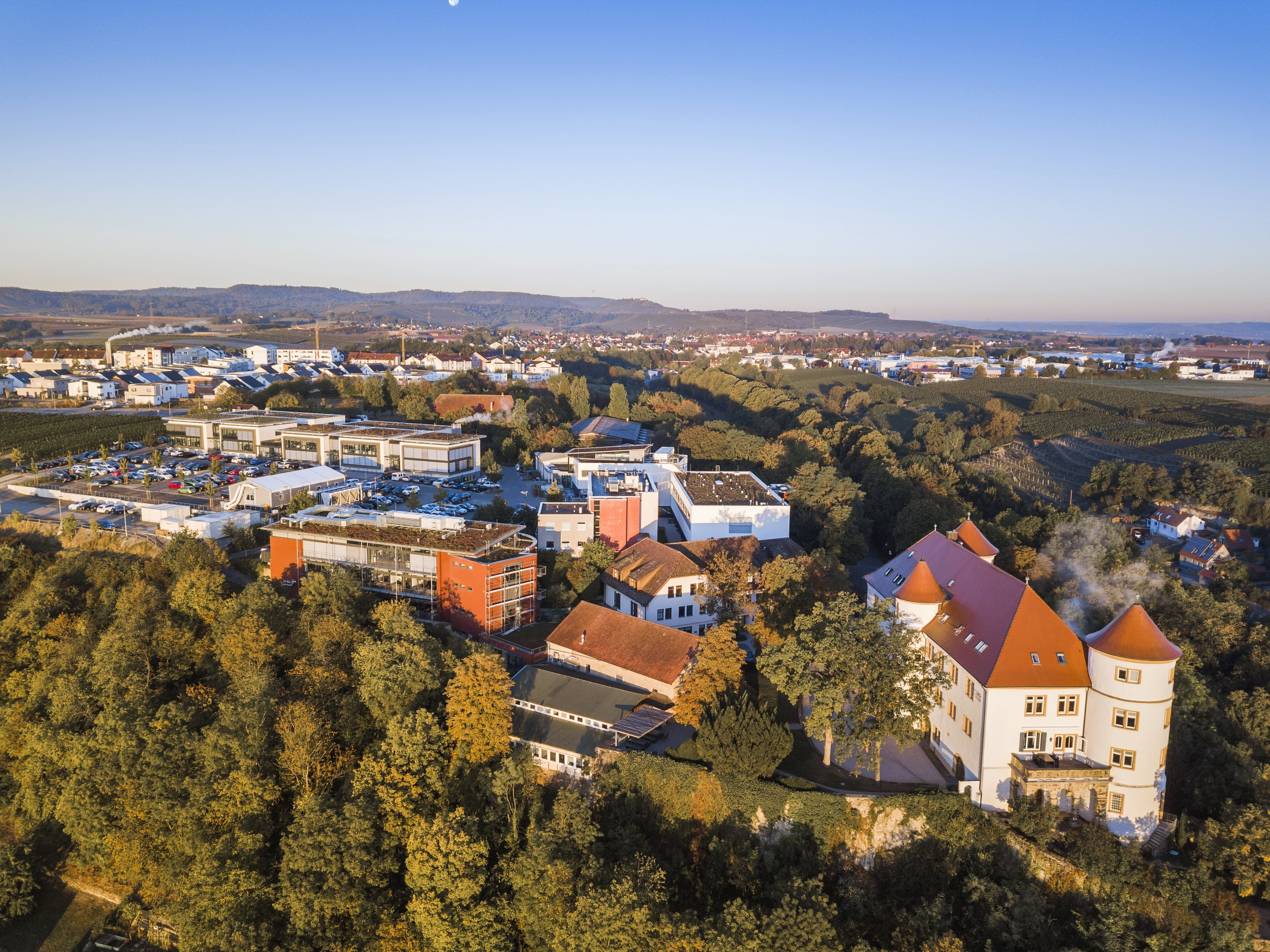
- Type: Private
- Industry: Testing, certification, and research
- Founded: 1946
- Founder: Otto Mecheels
- Headquarters: Bönnigheim, Germany
- Key people: Stefan Mecheels
- Services: Customized and standardized testing of materials related to textiles, chemicals, disinfectants; Certifications of products, systems and processes
- Number of employees: ~1,000 (2022)
- Website: Hohenstein website

The Hohenstein Laboratories (also known as Hohenstein Group) is an international research and testing company founded in 1946. Around 1,000 employees work at the headquarters in Bönnigheim, Germany, as well as in 44 other countries.

== History ==
In 1946, Otto Mecheels founded the Hohenstein Laboratories. Mecheels had taught students in Mönchengladbach at the time and had returned to his home Hohenstein with his staff after World War II. He continued teaching in the Renaissance castle Hohenstein, which he rented from the French military government. (Note: This Hohenstein Castle lies in North Rhine-Westphalia. Note that there is also a different Hohenstein Castle, in Bavaria.) Since 1952, the castle has been in possession of the Mecheels family. From the 1960s onwards, Jürgen Mecheels, son of Otto, took over the institution and expanded it internationally, adding new services and areas of research. He was a co-founder of the International Association for Research and Testing with its Oeko-Tex test certificate. With the certificate, the group awards, among other things, the Oeko-Tex Standard 100. The label certifies textiles tested for harmful substances and can be found worldwide.

Since 1995, the family business has been managed by Stefan Mecheels, the third generation, expanding the Hohenstein Group's laboratory network overseas and founding the Hohenstein Academy. Laboratory locations were established in India, Bangladesh, Hong Kong, Shanghai and Hungary between 1995 and 2015, as well as a total of 46 foreign offices in 42 countries.

Until 2022, new facilities at the headquarters followed, and the international network expanded to 45 countries. In addition, at the end of 2022, the group invested in the company Sizekick, a spin-off of the consultancy Presize. In 2023, the laboratory QAT Services Limited in Hong Kong was acquired. The acquisition expanded the testing spectrum to include food contact materials, furniture, toys, hardlines and other goods.

== Business activities ==
=== Testing and certification ===
Hohenstein carries out tests and assessments of product quality and performance in its accredited laboratories. The test results are documented with various certificates and labels, such as the Oeko-Tex. Hohenstein certifications and product labels are based on applied research and real-life conditions. The group works in different areas: softlines and hardlines, tests in the field of conformity with sustainability criteria such as the Oeko-Tex standards, performance of products related to health standards, fit, functionality and textile care.

=== Research ===
Hohenstein conducts research within the framework of public projects and is a research institute cooperating with the industry. Furthermore, it advises companies and provides training as well as research-related testing services. Among other things, the group's projects explore areas of product application and develop product concepts for textiles and clothing.

The Hohenstein Group is member of several research cooperations, such as the Innovationsallianz Baden-Württemberg (Innovation Alliance Baden-Württemberg) or the Allianz für Faserbasierte Werkstoffe Baden-Württemberg e. V. (Alliance for fiber-based materials Baden-Württemberg).

== Corporate structure ==
The Hohenstein Group specialises in testing, certifying and researching textile products of all kinds, and employs around 1,000 people with 5,000 customers from industry, trade, and commerce. The shares in the company are owned by the founding family Mecheels. A family advisory board was founded in 2022. Operations are carried out by the Hohenstein Laboratories GmbH & Co. KG (HL), Hohenstein Textile Testing Institute GmbH & Co. KG (HTTI) and Hohenstein Institut für Textilinnovation gGmbH (HIT) as well as by the group's foreign subsidiaries.

HL carries out testing for efficacy and safety on medical products, disinfectants, textiles, etc. Training is also conducted under the umbrella of HL. HTTI conducts materials testings, related to textile and/or related products. HIT conducts research in the fields of textile, hygiene and related areas. Under the umbrella of the Forschungsinstitut Hohenstein Prof. Dr. Jürgen Mecheels GmbH & Co. KG are gathered all affiliated foreign branches.

== Bibliography ==
- Konrad, W.; Scheer, D. (2010). Epp, A.; Kurzenhäuser, S.; Hertel, R.; Böl, G.-F. (eds.). Grenzen und Möglichkeiten der Verbraucherinformation durch Produktkennzeichnung [Limits and possibilities of consumer information through product labelling] (PDF) (in German). Berlin: Federal Institute for Risk Assessment. ISBN 3938163488.
- Piegsa, Edith (2010). Green Fashion: Ökologische Nachhaltigkeit in der Bekleidungsindustrie [Green Fashion: Ecological sustainability in the clothing industry] (in German). Bedey und Thoms Media. ISBN 978-3-8366-4625-3.
