= Testex =

TESTEX AG
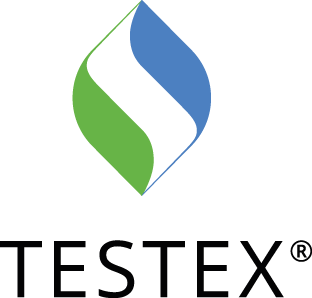
- Industry: Textile testing, certification
- Founded: September 22, 1846; 178 years ago in Zürich, Switzerland
- Headquarters: Zürich, Switzerland
- Key people: Rainer Roten (CEO)
- Website: www.testex.com

Testex, stylized as TESTEX, is a globally operating, independent Swiss testing and certification organisation that focuses on textile testing. The Testex corporate group is headquartered in Zürich and consists of the Testex AG, ÖTI GmbH (Austria), PT Testex (Indonesia), Swiss Textile-Testing Ltd. Hong Kong, and Testex Testing Co. Ltd. Beijing.

Testex AG emerged from the "Seidentrocknungsanstalt Zürich" founded in 1846, and operates more than 20 branches worldwide. Testex is the official representative of the Oeko-Tex Association in Australia, Canada, the P.R. China, Hong Kong, Indonesia, Malaysia, New Zealand, the Philippines, Switzerland, South Korea and Taiwan.

== Operations ==
=== Analytical testing ===
The analytical laboratory at Testex is ISO 17025 certified and conducts a variety of analytical tests designed to detect pollutants, residues, and trace elements in textiles. Testing and auditing are also conducted in accordance with the guidelines specified by the Oeko-Tex Association. These include Standard 100 by Oeko-Tex, Step, Made in green, Eco passport, Allergy Standards and the Leather standard.

=== Testing ===
Testex conducts physical and chemical tests on fibers, yarns/ strings, woven fabrics, knitted fabrics, nonwoven fabrics, and finished products. The services also include physiological tests on textile fabrics and ready-made textiles, flooring tests and the testing of personal protective equipment (PPE) in accordance with ISO 17065, which involves various flaming tests.

== History ==
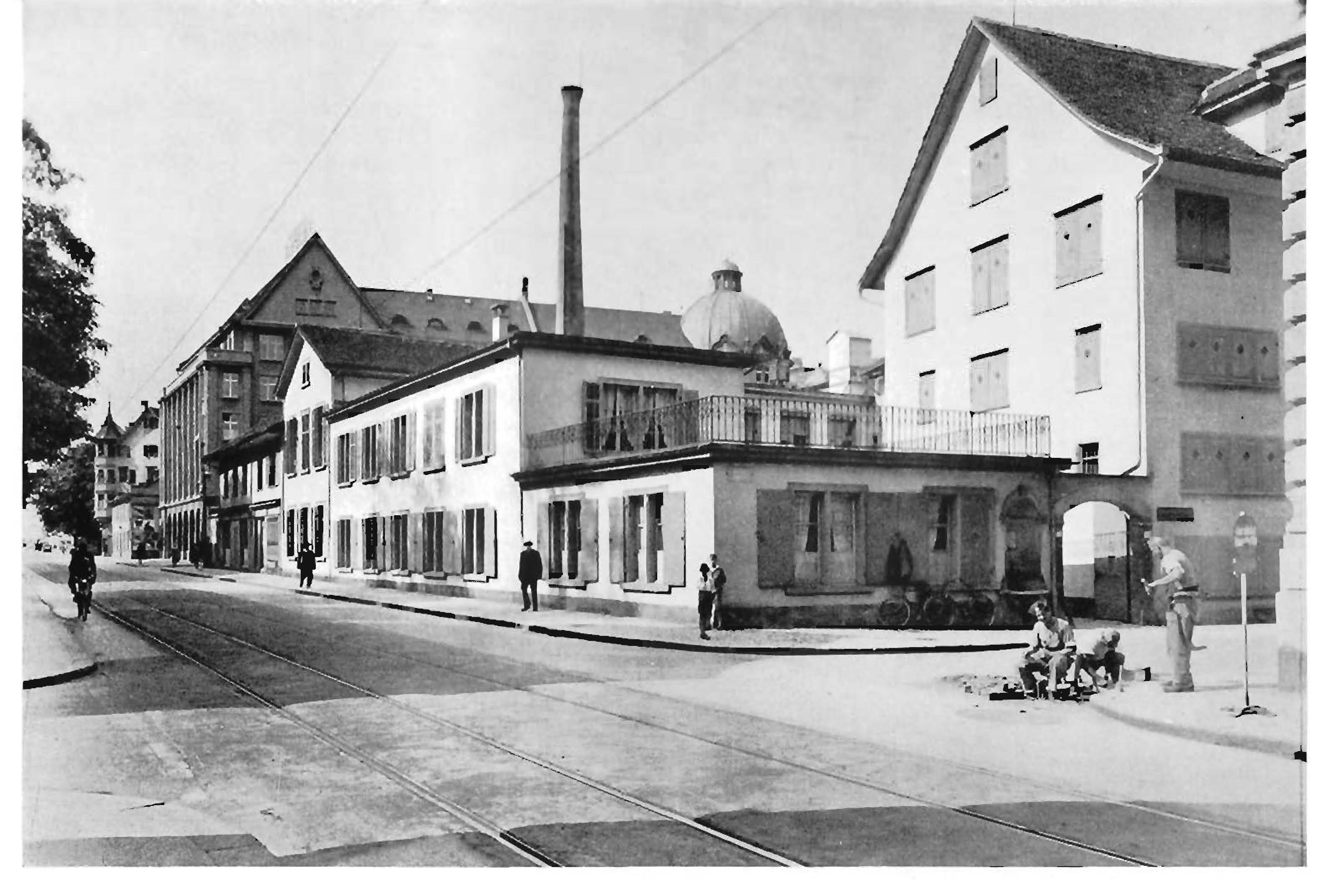
Testex headquarters in 1861

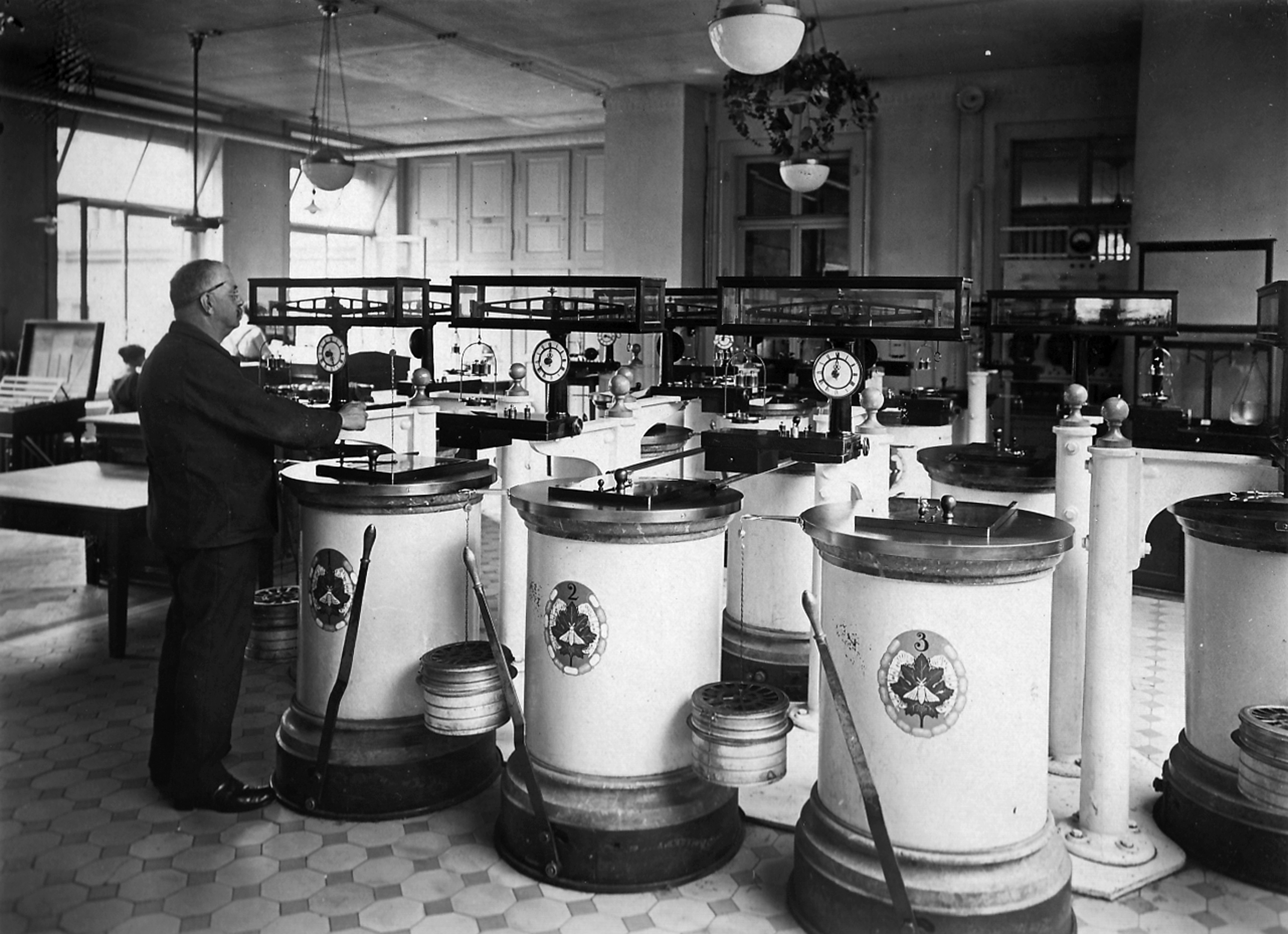
Silk-drying ovens in 1918

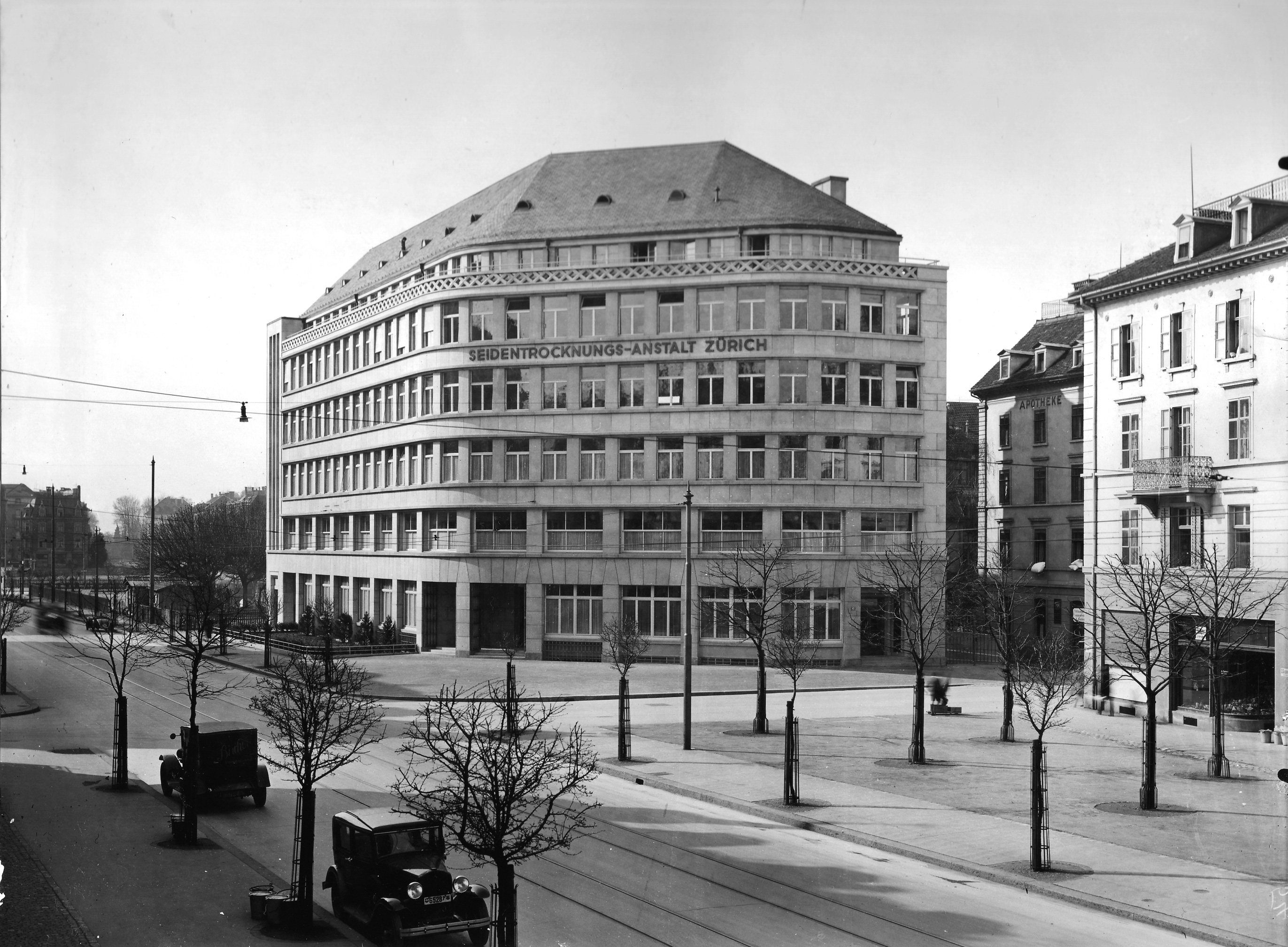
Testex's new Gotthardstrasse building in 1932

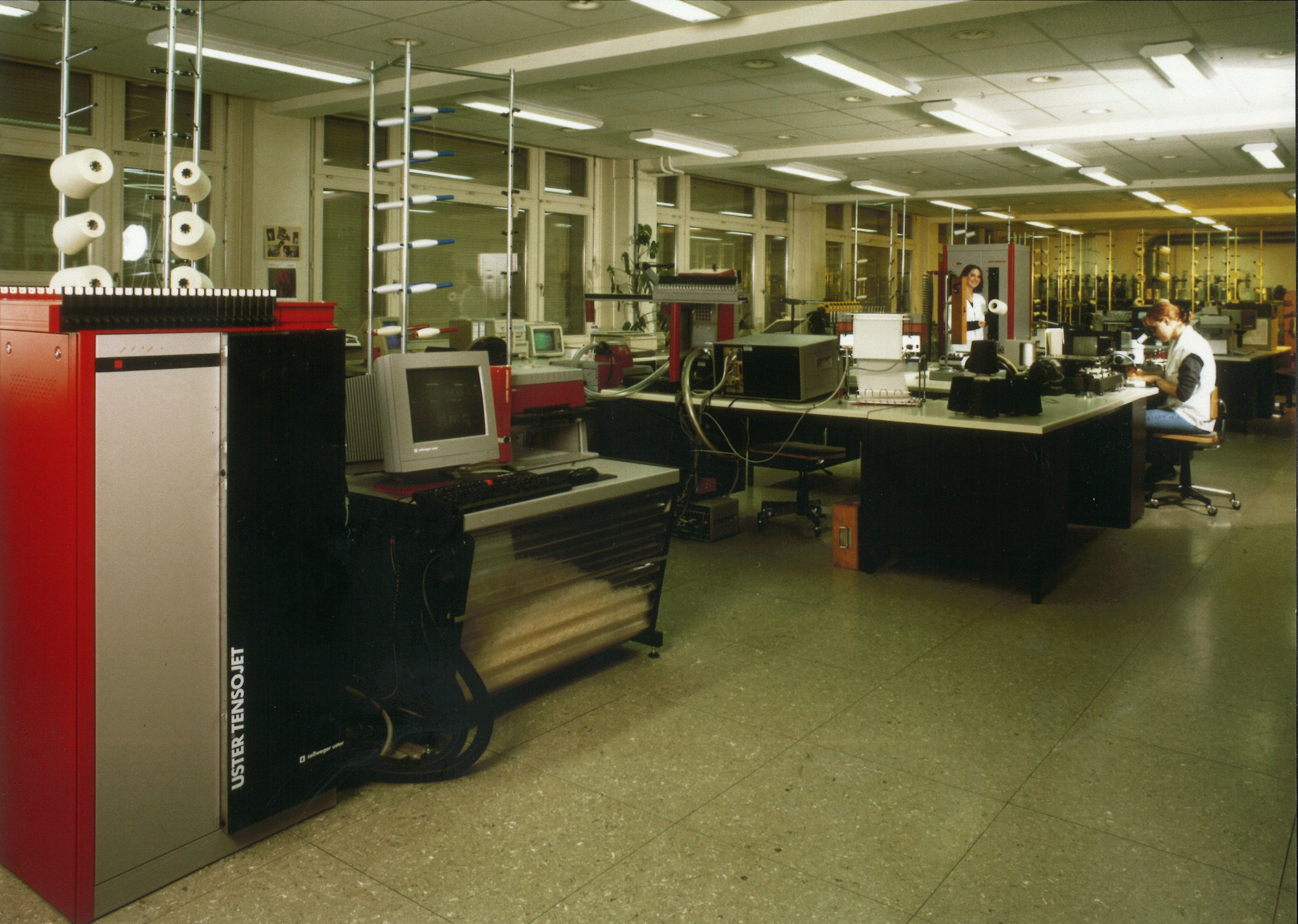
Testex computer lab in 1995

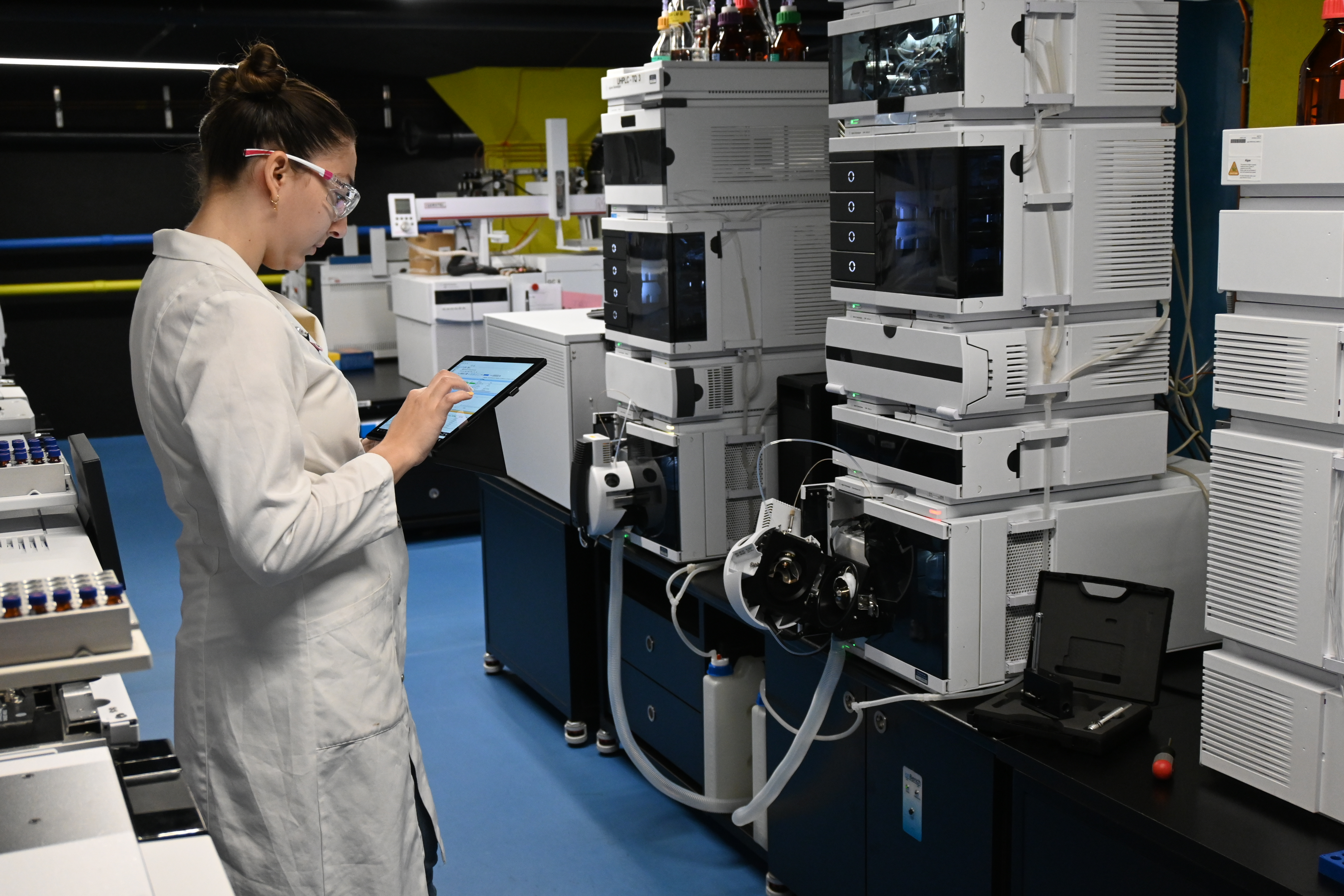
Testex lab in 2021

=== 1846-1919 Foundation of the Silk Conditioning Institute and early development ===
Testex AG was founded as the Zurich Silk Conditioning Institute in 1846 to combat silk fraud, which was a common practice at the time. As silk can contain a high percentage of water without seeming wet – which leads to fluctuation in weight – drying the material and determining its actual weight was necessary to set prices.

On 1 July 1847, the Silk Conditioning Institute started its operations. In addition to silk, the institute also started to determine the commercial weight for the Basel ribbon industry.

In 1870, the institute started testing the quality of the silk as well as the weight. During World War I, profits were low due to inflation of the European currencies and difficulties with regard to sales, trade and communication as well as war taxes.

=== 1920-1980 World War II and transformation ===
The recession of the 1920 affected the institute, however, after the post-war recession had been overcome, the second half of the decade was a period of prosperity. In 1932, the Zurich Silk Conditioning Institute moved to Gotthardstrasse 61.

Since the turn of the century, artificial silk was increasingly in competition with silk, making it necessary to develop new quality testing methods. After the end of the Second World War, the Zurich Silk Conditioning Institute managed to remain profitable by including other yarns in their testing process.

At the beginning of the 1960s, the Zurich Silk Conditioning Institute faced numerous restructuring processes. A new administrative board decided that the Zurich Silk Association (ZSIG) should have a textile testing institute, and a large package of shares was transferred to the ZSIG, which thus became the largest shareholder. As the importance of silk was declining, the institute changed its name to Testex AG in 1970.

=== 1981-2006 Shift of strategy and expansion ===
At the start of the 1980s, Testex was operating at a loss, in spite of the modernisation measures. As a consequence there were personnel changes and the company shifted its focus towards textile testing outside of the silk industry, for example cotton.

At the beginning of the 1990s, Testex also progressed into the field of testing for harmful substances.

In 1993, Testex joined the Öko-Tex Association. In addition, the business expanded into the Asian market, where the demand for Öko-Tex tests was high, opening the first branch abroad in Hong Kong in 1995.

From the mid-1990s, testing focused less on the textile itself, but rather on the conditions under which the textile was produced. The “Öko-Tex Standard 1000”, which was introduced in 1995, incorporated additional parameters into the assessment.

1999 a branch was opened in Shanghai.

=== 2007-today Economic boom and global expansion ===
In 2012, Testex took over ÖTI Wien, an Austrian textile testing institute.

At the end of 2006, Testex AG had 66 employees, whereas in 2021 the company had employed over 300 people in 30 locations worldwide.

== Bibliography ==
- Hans Jenny, Hundert Jahre Seidentrocknungs-Anstalt Zürich. 1846–1946, Zürich: Orell Füssli AG 1946 (German)
