= Erligheim =

German municipality

- Municipality
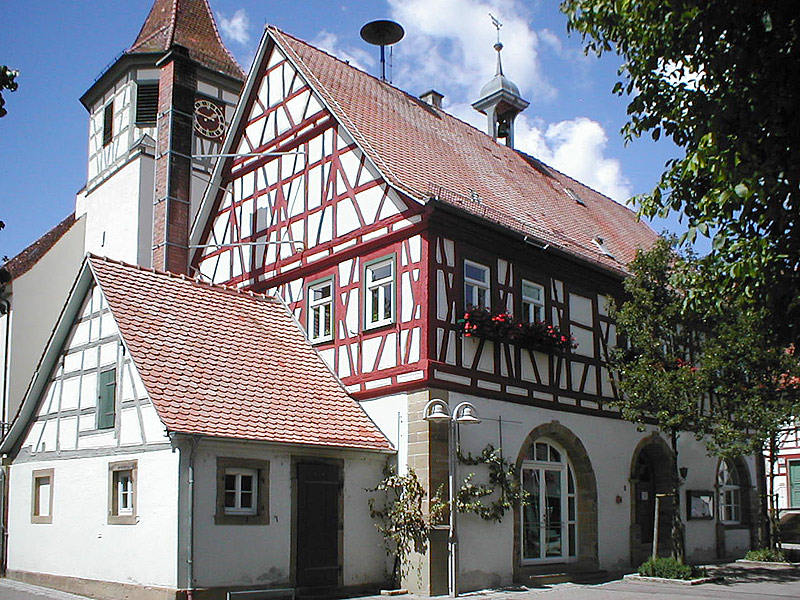
- Old town hall

- Coat of arms

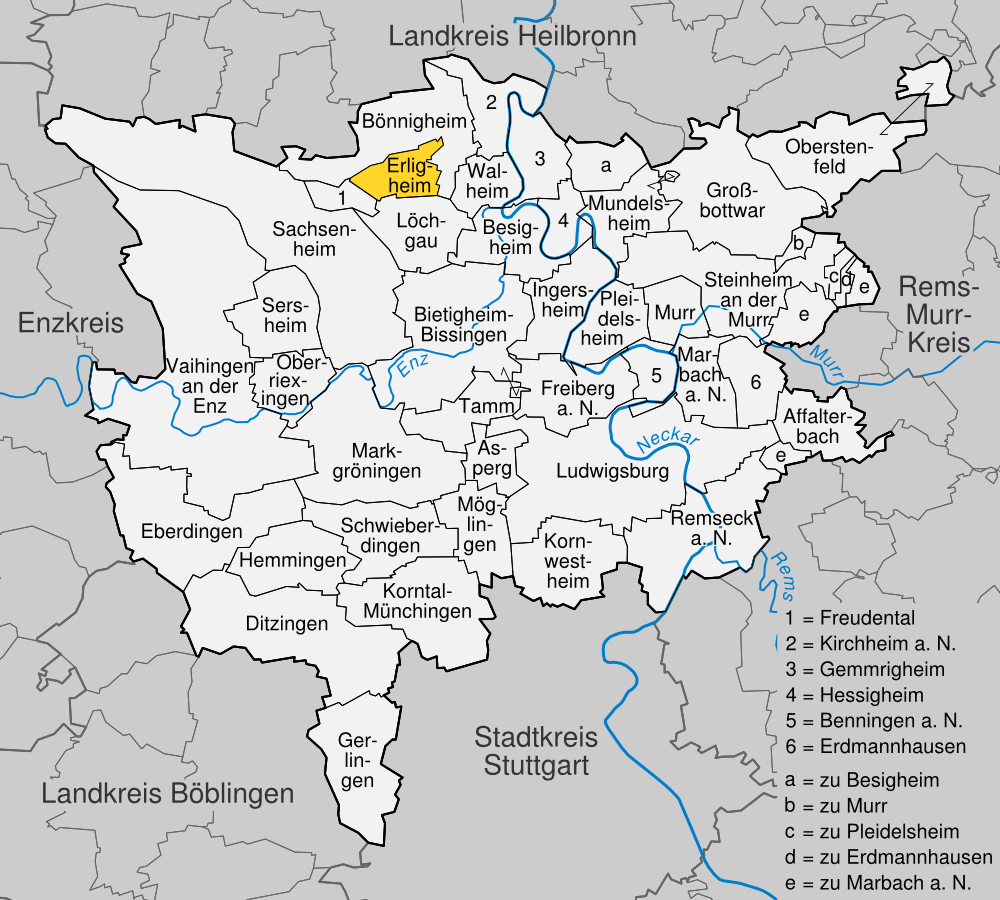
- Location of Erligheim within Ludwigsburg district
- Interactive map of Erligheim
- Location within Germany Location within Baden-Württemberg
- Coordinates: 49°01′06″N 09°05′58″E
- Country: Germany
- State: Baden-Württemberg
- Admin. region: Stuttgart
- District: Ludwigsburg

Government
  - Mayor (2022–30): Rainer Schäuffele

Area
  - Total: 6.19 km^{2} (2.39 sq mi)
- Elevation: 259 m (850 ft)

Population (2025-12-31)
  - Total: 3,074
  - Density: 497/km^{2} (1,290/sq mi)
- Time zone: UTC+01:00 (CET)
  - Summer (DST): UTC+02:00 (CEST)
- Postal codes: 74391
- Dialling codes: 07143
- Vehicle registration: LB
- Website: www.erligheim.de

Erligheim (German pronunciation: [ˈeːɐ̯lɪkˌhaɪ̯m]) is a municipality in the district of Ludwigsburg in Baden-Württemberg in Germany.

== History ==
The villages Erligheim and Bönnigheim were donated to Lorsch Abbey in 793. In 1574, Erligheim was broken per Ganerbschaft into quarters that eventually came into the possession of the Elector of Mainz. Erligheim became a possession of the Duchy of Württemberg in 1785 and was assigned to Oberamt Bönnigheim. The village was transferred in 1808 to Oberamt Besigheim, where in 1822 it became an independent municipality. When Oberamt Besigheim was dissolved in 1938, it was replaced with the newly organized Landkreis Ludwigsburg, to which Erligheim was assigned.

== Geography ==
The municipality (Gemeinde) of Erligheim is located in the district of Ludwigsburg, in Baden-Württemberg, one of the 16 States of the Federal Republic of Germany. Erligheim is physically located in the basin of the Neckar, though some of its area reaches the Stromberg and the Heuchelberg to the west and the Zabergäu to the north. Elevation above sea level in the municipal area ranges from a high of 331 meters (1,086 ft) Normalnull (NN) to a low of 197 meters (646 ft) NN.

== Politics ==
Erligheim has one borough (Ortsteil), Erligheim, one village, Lange Äcker, and one abandoned village, Birlingen.

=== Coat of arms ===
Erligheim's coat of arms shows a green adler tree rooted to a field of white and decorated with an anthropomorphic, red moon. This image has its origin in 1751, though it was used as a municipal coat of arms from 1913 to 1979 without the moon. The moon was re-added to the blazon in 1979, and this change was approved by the Ludwigsburg district office on 8 April 1980. A corresponding municipal flag was also issued.

== Transportation ==
Erligheim is connected to Germany's network of roadways by the Bundesstraße 27. Local public transportation is provided by the Verkehrs- und Tarifverbund Stuttgart.
