= AITEX =

Spanish technological center

Coordinates: 38.6898°N 0.4966°W

The AITEX Textile Technological Institute is a technological center headquartered in Spain dedicated to research in the fields of science and technology that have applications in the textile industry.

== Details ==
It is a private non-profit association, made up of textile and related companies, with the main objective of improving the competitiveness of the sector and offering society textile-based solutions that contribute to improved well-being, health, and quality of life for people. The commonly used name is AITEX as it is the Spanish language acronym for "Textile Industry Research Association". It was established in 1985 at the initiative of the Valencian government, through the Institute of Small and Medium Industry of the Valencian Government (IMPIVA). Its founding President was Ricardo Cardona Salvador, who served until 1992. Rafael Terol Aznar was Honorary "Conseller" from 1992 to 2009. The headquarters are located in Alcoy, a city in Alicante with an industrial and textile tradition, but it also has two Technical Units. One is located in the Valencia Technology Park, and the other in Ontinyent, from where support is offered to each of these industrial areas. On an international level, it also has delegations in China, India, and Pakistan.

The institute works in various areas of knowledge, including intelligent and functional textiles, textile comfort, biotechnology applications in textile processes, nanotechnology applied to the development of textile materials, new textile processes, and textile solutions for areas such as health, personal protection, and security.

AITEX has published a publication called AITEX Review since 2000, a four-monthly publication that collects innovations and the technical and scientific news that is applied in the textile sector.

In 2005, AITEX created the Made in Green label, a certification that guarantees that products do not have harmful substances for health and that from its perspective the environment and the universal rights of workers have been respected.
