= Sleeping bag =

Insulated covering for a person

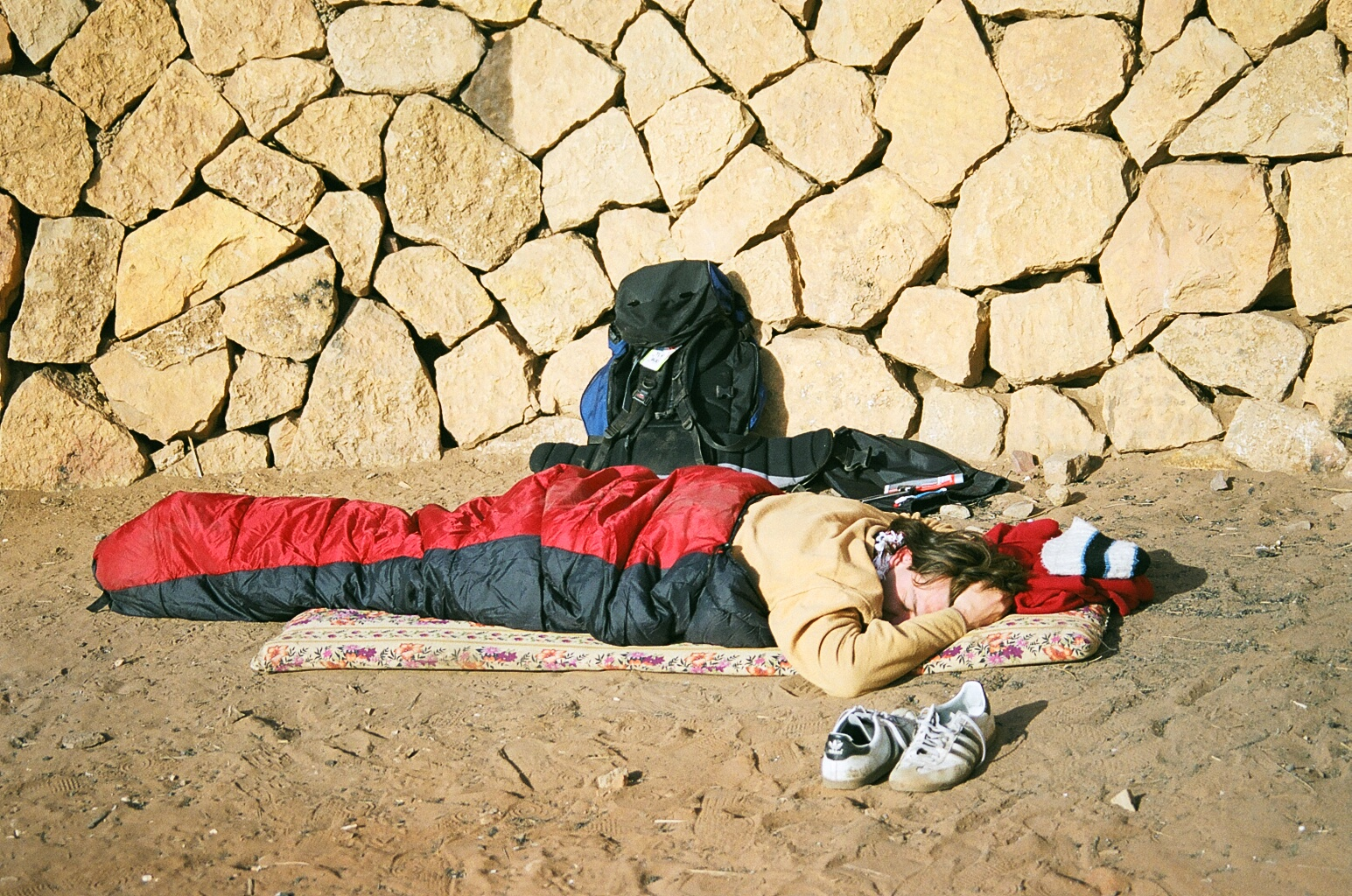
A tourist in a sleeping bag

A sleeping bag is an insulated covering for a person, essentially a lightweight quilt that can be closed with a zipper or similar means to form a tube, which functions as lightweight, portable bedding in situations where a person is sleeping outdoors (e.g. when camping, hiking, hill walking or climbing). It is also commonly used indoors for people who do not have beds or at sleepovers. Its primary purpose is to provide warmth and thermal insulation through its synthetic or down insulation. It also typically has a water-resistant or water-repellent cover that protects, to some extent, against wind chill and light precipitation, but a tent is usually used in addition to a sleeping bag, as it performs those functions better. The bottom surface also provides some cushioning, but a sleeping pad or camp cot is usually used in addition to that purpose. The bottom surface of a sleeping bag may be moderately water repellent, but a plastic tarp or groundsheet is often used to protect against moist ground.

There are a range of sleeping bag models designed for different purposes. Very lightly insulated sleeping bags are designed for summer camping use or indoor use by children during slumber parties. Well-insulated bags are designed for cold weather use. The most well-insulated and lightweight sleeping bags, which are designed for serious hikers and adventurers, are more expensive than lightly insulated sleeping bags. One subcategory of cold-weather sleeping bags, the mummy bag, is so named because it has an insulated hood for the head. A bivouac sack (bivy) is a waterproof cover for a sleeping bag that may be used in place of a tent by minimalist, experienced hikers. A bivy bag may also be carried by day hikers as a backup or emergency shelter, to be used if they cannot make it back to their starting point by nightfall due to inclement weather or getting lost.

== History ==
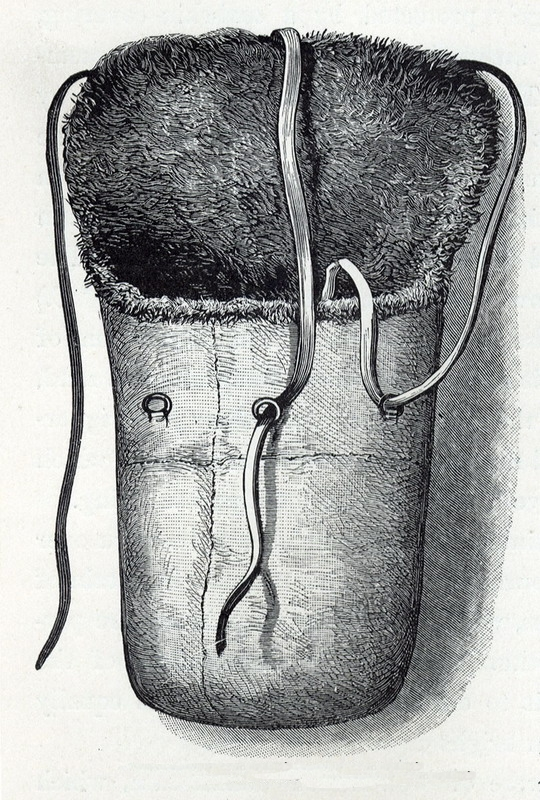
A three-person buffalo sleeping bag used during Arctic exploration circa 1880

In the 1850s, Elverys Sports in Ireland marketed a proto-sleeping bag known as the Crimea Wrapper towards soldiers being posted to the Crimean War.

The "Euklisia Rug", from Ancient Greek εὖ (well) and κλισία (cot, sleeping-place), patented by mail-order pioneer Pryce Pryce-Jones in 1876, was also a forerunner of the modern sleeping bag. Pryce-Jones, a Newtown, Montgomeryshire, Welsh entrepreneur developed the bag and exported it around the world in the late 19th century. Documents show he sold 60,000 of these rugs to the Russian army – and the British Army also bought them. There are records of civilian uses among missionaries in Africa and pioneers in the Australian outback.

== Design types ==
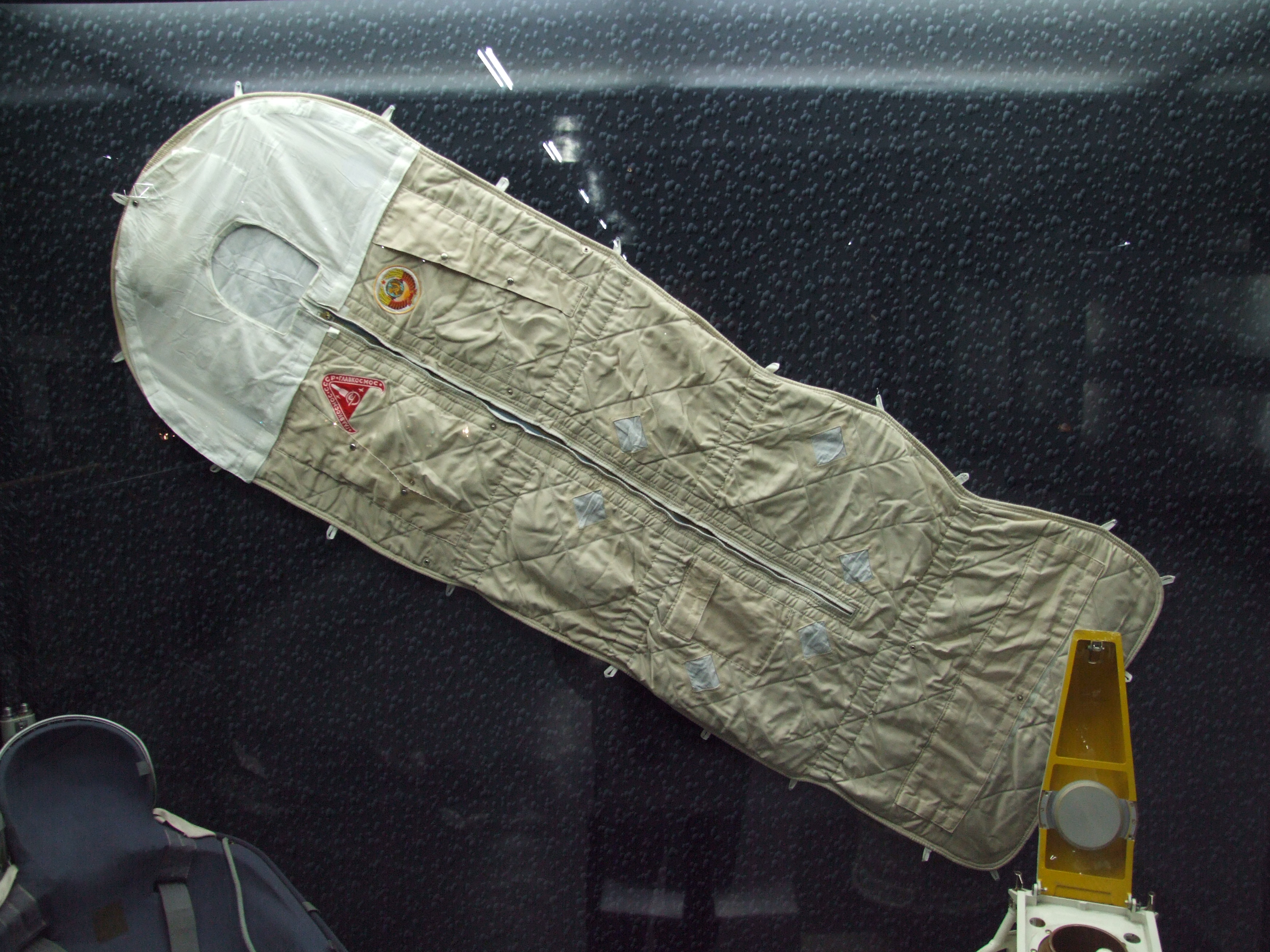
Russian sleeping bag used in space station Mir and International Space Station

A basic sleeping bag is simply a square blanket or quilt, fitted with a zipper on two or three sides, which enables users to get into the bag and then close it up. A sleeping bag of this type is packed by being folded in half or thirds, rolled up, and bound with straps or cords with cord locks. The basic design works well for most camping needs but is inadequate under more demanding circumstances.

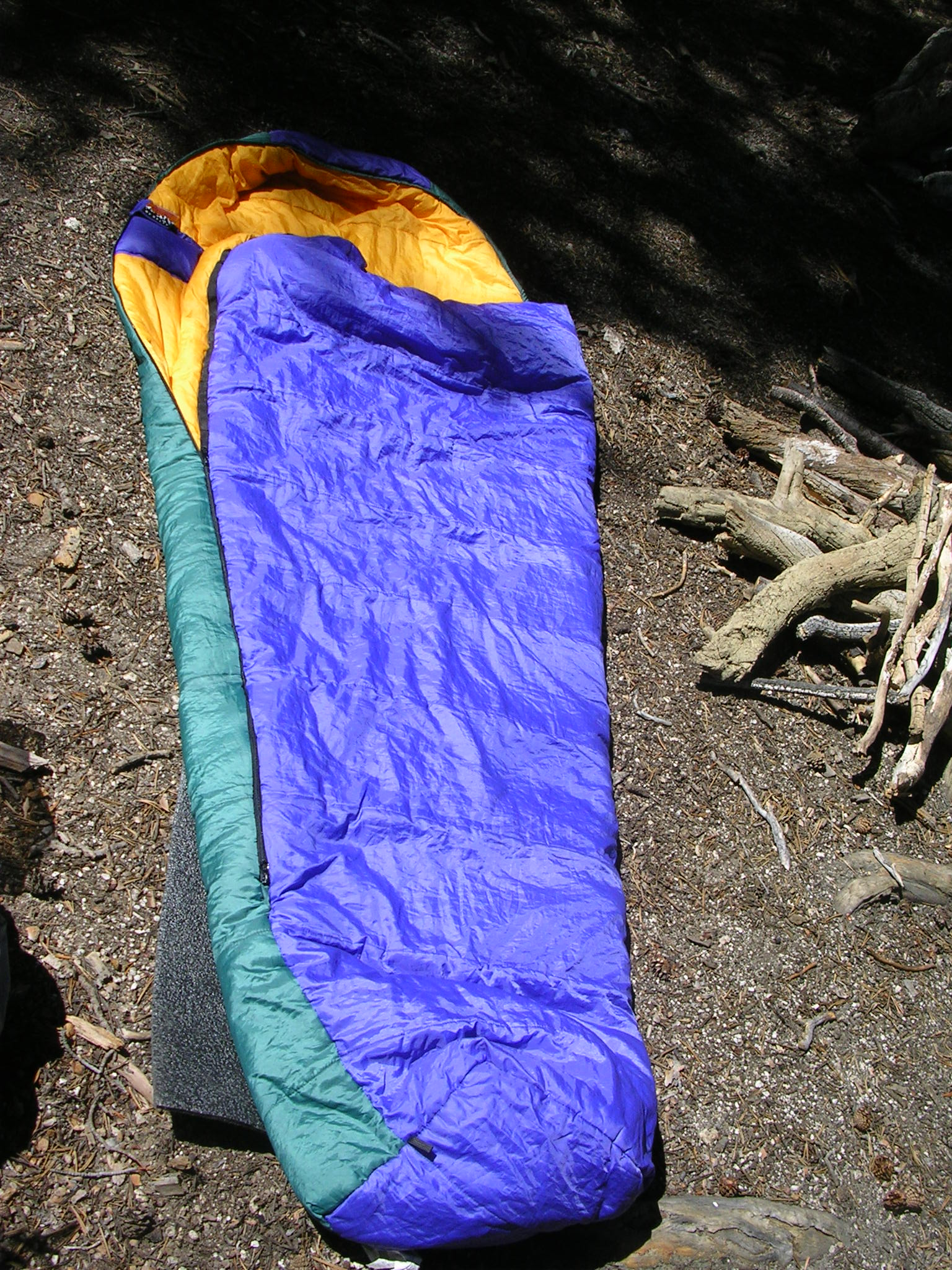
A mummy bag, so named because it has an insulated hood which keeps the head warm. A foam sleeping pad can be seen underneath the sleeping bag.

The second major type of sleeping bag, sometimes called a mummy bag because of its shape, is different in several important ways. It tapers from the head end to the foot end, reducing its volume and surface area, and improving its overall heat retention properties. Some bags are designed especially to accommodate women's body shapes. Most mummy bags do not unzip to the feet, because the zipper is a weak point in any sleeping bag's insulating qualities. Together with the tapered shape, this design feature helps protect the feet, which are more vulnerable to heat loss than other parts of the body. Another design feature is a drawstring, equipped with a cord lock, at the head end to help prevent the escape of warm air. A mummy bag often cannot be rolled neatly like a rectangular bag. Instead, it is simply stuffed into a stuff sack or compression sack.

The bottom of a sleeping bag typically does not provide significant insulation, because body weight crushes the loft of the insulation material. It is therefore necessary to use a pad or other less crushable insulation underneath the sleeper, especially in cold weather. Due to this, some sleeping bags do not include insulation on the bottom. Some include a sleeve for holding a sleeping pad. Additionally, some campers, especially ultralight backpackers or hammock campers, have started to use a top quilt, essentially a sleeping bag without a back. Some top quilts include a foot box, while others are just simple blankets.

== Fill ==
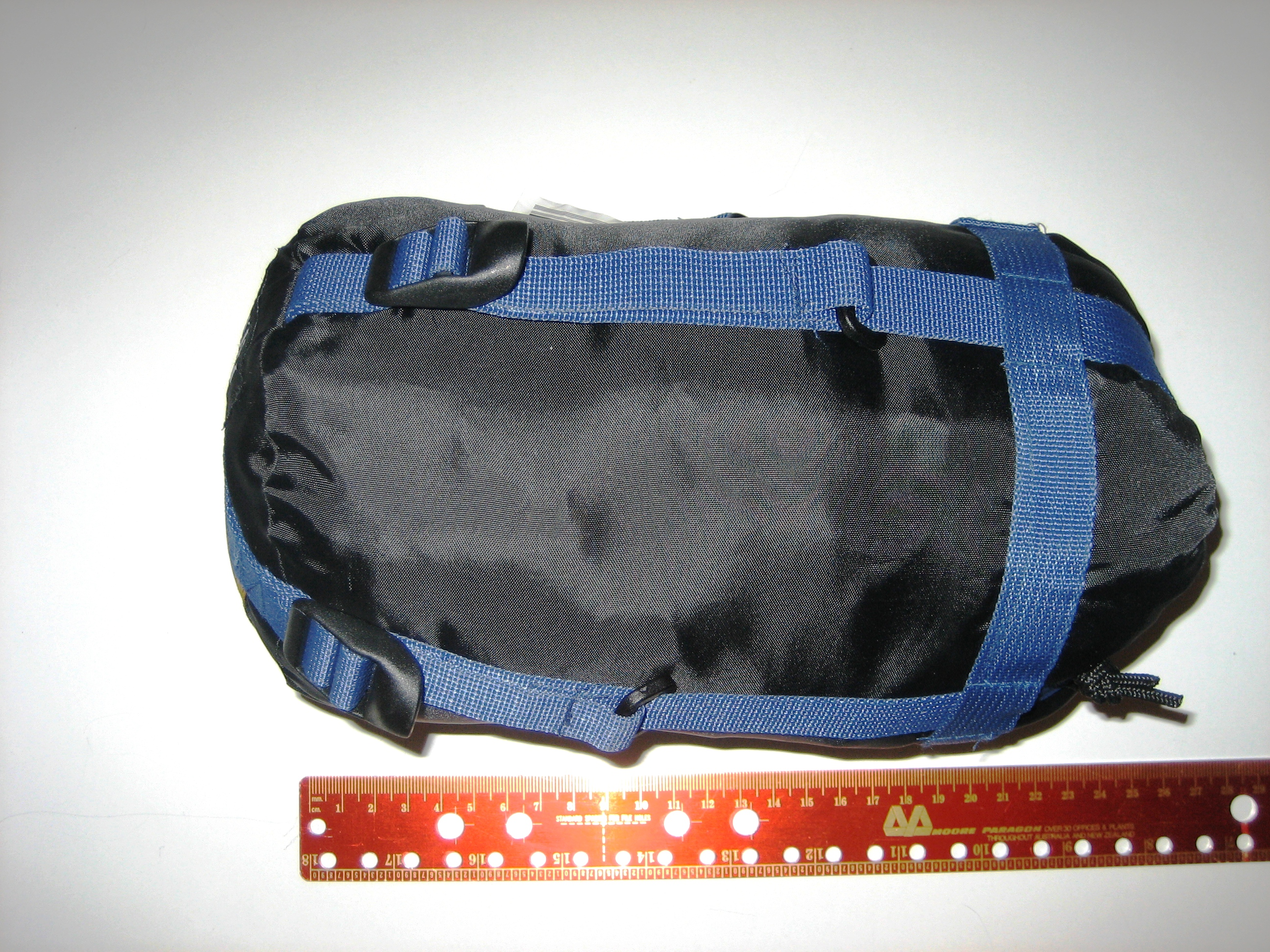
A highly compact sleeping bag measuring 23 cm (9 in) with a diameter of 12 cm (5 in) when packed but 210 cm × 65 cm (6.89 ft × 2.13 ft) when unfolded.

Many insulating materials are available for sleeping bags. Inexpensive sleeping bags for warm weather use or use by children indoors typically have a layer of synthetic quilt insulation. Outdoor professionals and serious amateur adventurers usually prefer either synthetic fill (e.g., PrimaLoft), or natural fill (e.g., down), and they have debated the merits of these materials for years.

Synthetic fill does not readily absorb water, dries easily, and provides some warmth even when thoroughly soaked. These properties may save the user's life if, for example, the sleeping bag is accidentally dropped into water on a cold day. Synthetic material is also firm and resilient, so it insulates well even underneath a person's weight. However, synthetic fill cannot be compressed as much and is heavier, so the load volume and weight are greater with synthetic fill bags. Furthermore, synthetic insulation tends to break down faster than its natural counterpart.

Down fill weighs less than synthetic and retains heat better, but usually costs more. Down must be kept dry; a soaked down sleeping bag may provide even less insulation than no sleeping bag at all, leading to hypothermia. Newer, more technically advanced sleeping bags often have water-resistant shells and can be used in damper conditions. It is also recommended to keep a sleeping bag in a larger sack (storage sack) as opposed to a small traveling sack (compression bag) during long periods of storage. However, many regular backpackers and hikers agree that hanging a sleeping bag, and taking care to move the position of the bag on the hanger at intervals to not create a "dead spot" (a spot where the fill has been crushed so that it is no longer useful), is the best method of storing a bag for long periods.

Other materials, notably cotton and wool, have also been used for sleeping bags. Wool repels water nicely and also resists compression, but it weighs much more than any alternative. Cotton suffers from high water retention and significant weight, but its low cost makes it an attractive option for uses like stationary camping or car camping where these drawbacks are of less consequence. Cotton insulation does not provide warmth if it becomes wet (due, for example, to the sleeping bag falling into water), so cotton-insulated sleeping bags are not used by professionals or serious hikers.

=== Types of thermal insulation ===
- PrimaLoft
- Thinsulate
- Down feathers
- Polyester

== Temperature ratings ==
In Europe, the EN 13537 standard (introduced in 2005) normalizes the temperatures at which a sleeping bag is rated for use. In March 2010, REI began requiring American manufacturers to follow the EN 13537 standard. In October 2016, ISO 23537-1:2016 standard replaced the EN 13537 standard.

The test, relying on a heated mannequin, provides four temperatures:

- the upper limit is the highest temperature at which a "standard" adult man can have a comfortable night's sleep without excess sweating.
- the comfort rating is based on a "standard" adult woman having a comfortable night's sleep.
- the lower limit is based on the lowest temperature at which a "standard" adult man with a rolled-curled up body posture is globally in thermal equilibrium and just not feeling cold.
- the extreme rating is a survival-only rating for a "standard" adult man. This is an extreme survival rating only and it is not advisable to rely on this rating for general use.

The transition zone, in between the comfort and lower temperature, is usually considered the best purchase guideline.

A sleeping bag's rating typically indicates the lowest temperature at which it will keep the average sleeper warm. For example, with a 0 °C bag, a person should be able to sleep in 0 °C temperature, but not necessarily comfortably. A sleeping bag's test rating is based on a person who is wearing long underwear, socks and hat, and is sleeping on an insulated pad with an R-value of approximately 5.5.

There is no standard measurement rating in the U.S., so a 20 °F (−7 °C) bag from one company may not provide the same warmth as a 20 °F (−7 °C) from another company. Other important variables include what the user plans to wear while sleeping, what type of sleeping pad is used, and how well the user holds heat in the bag.

It has been shown that moisture (either externally, or from sweating) severely decreases the insulating effect of sleeping bags.

== Indoor sleeping bags ==
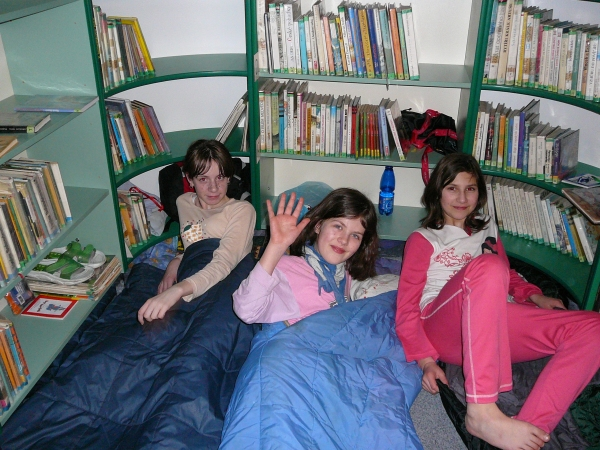
Girls with sleeping bags at a sleepover.

Indoor sleeping bags, sometimes called slumber bags, are widely available, often for use by children. These are usually not designed to be weatherproof and are often made of natural fabrics instead of synthetic fabrics commonly used for outdoor sleeping bags. Children's sleeping bags in particular often feature elaborate, brightly colored printed designs, such as images of popular media characters. Slumber bags make floor sleeping more comfortable, and are often used for sleepovers, family visits, and other situations where there are not enough beds for everyone or someone does not feel comfortable sharing a bed. The Icehotel in Jukkasjärvi, Sweden, provides polar-tested sleeping bags for use while sleeping on their beds, which are bedded with reindeer furs and have frames carved from ice.

== Infant use ==
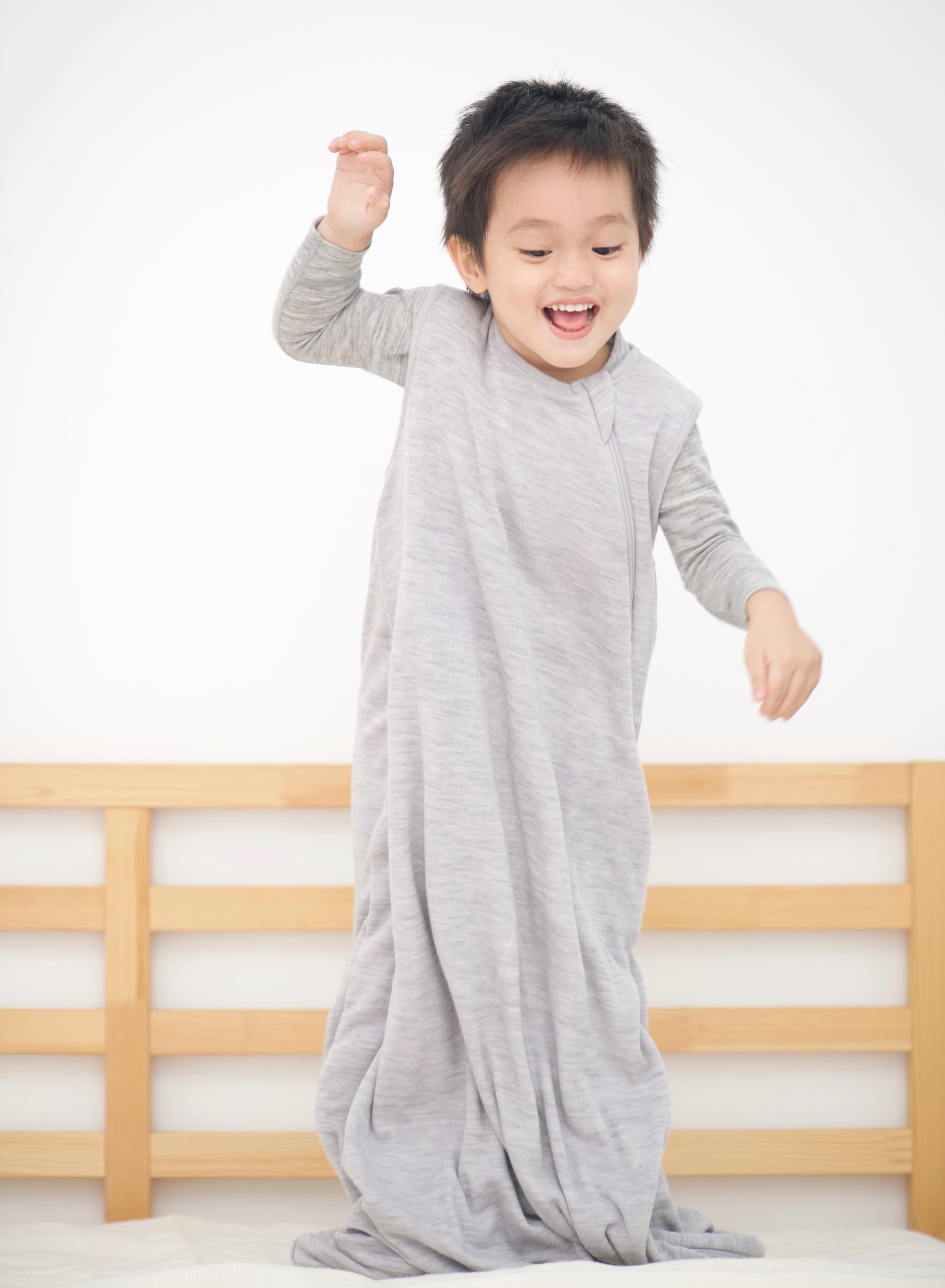
A toddler in a merino wool sleeping bag

An infant sleeping bag is a bag-like garment or covering worn by infants for sleeping in. Infant sleeping bags differ from regular sleeping bags in design and purpose, being designed primarily for indoor rather than outdoor use, and usually featuring either arm holes or sleeves.

In the market, there are available for winter and summer baby sleeping bags. Also, some brands make all-season baby sleeping bags.

The definition used in the British Standard, for the safety of children, sleep bags are "sleep bags for the use of children with a minimum weight of 4 kg designed to provide sufficient warmth to remove the need for additional bedding when sleeping in a cot or similar product in which a child is contained." It goes on to exclude "garments with sleeves and feet, i.e. sleep suits or baby grows, or to products designed primarily for outdoor use or to keep children warm when in a pushchair."

== See also ==
- Cowboy bedroll
- Mosquito net
- Pertex
- Sleeping bag liner
- Swaddling
