= Holubar Mountaineering =

Climbing equipment manufacturer

Holubar Mountaineering, established in 1947 by Roy and Alice Holubar, designed and sold mountaineering equipment. The company pioneered the use of lightweight down sleeping bags made with nylon fabric, which became popular in the 1960s. Holubar manufactured many of its own products and offered high quality climbing and camping equipment and supplies for retail sale. Local design and manufacturing also lent itself to introducing a line of "sew-it-yourself" kits which became a popular, if short-lived, offering during the 1970s. Starting in Boulder, Colorado, the company grew to ten stores in Denver, Fort Collins, Colorado Springs and other Colorado Front Range cities and a few out-of-state locations in addition to a sizeable mail order business.

The company was highly respected for its innovation in design and manufacturing of lightweight, yet rugged mountaineering soft-gear including clothing, parkas, tents, and sleeping bags. Building on its core products, Holubar positioned itself as a specialty retailer in marketing high-end mountaineering, climbing, hiking, x-country & backcountry skiing, and related products. Holubar pioneered a number of retail practices in customer loyalty such as offering in-store customer clinics that included lectures by well known outdoor and sport personalities and a customer commitment that if at any time they were dissatisfied with a product purchased, they could return it. In addition, Holubar hired retail staff personnel who shared a passion for the outdoors and knew products from firsthand use and could relate to customer interests and requirements.

Holubar grew rapidly from the 1960s into the 1970s during the explosion of interest in the United States of backpacking and mountaineering recreation. The company was purchased by Johnson Wax circa 1975 and despite an attempt to transition from a high cost manufacturing to lower cost design and manufacturing model, Holubar failed to meet the business expectations of its owner. The brand and business was sold to The North Face in 1981 and shortly after the stores and products re-branded to The North Face.
