= Thread (textiles) =

Type of yarn used for sewing

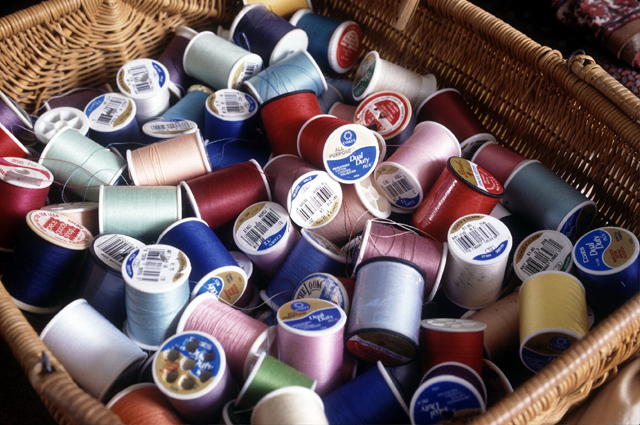
An assortment of different colors of thread

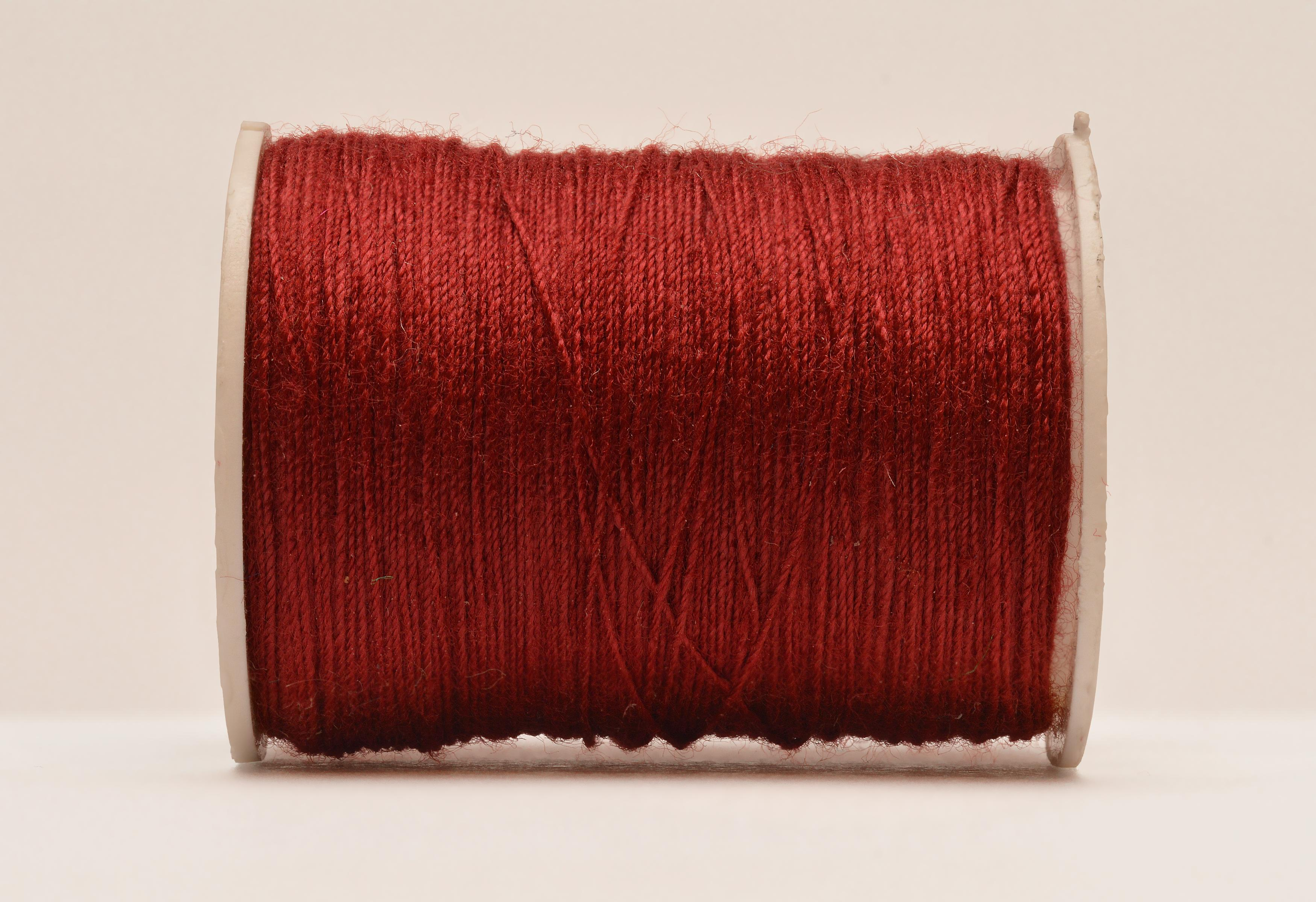
Red thread bobbin

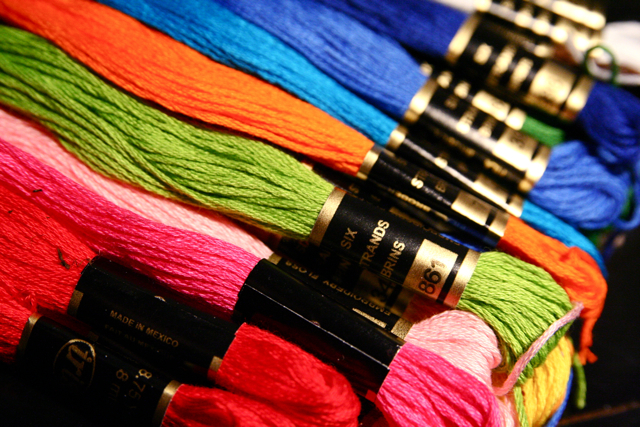
Multi-colored stranded embroidery floss

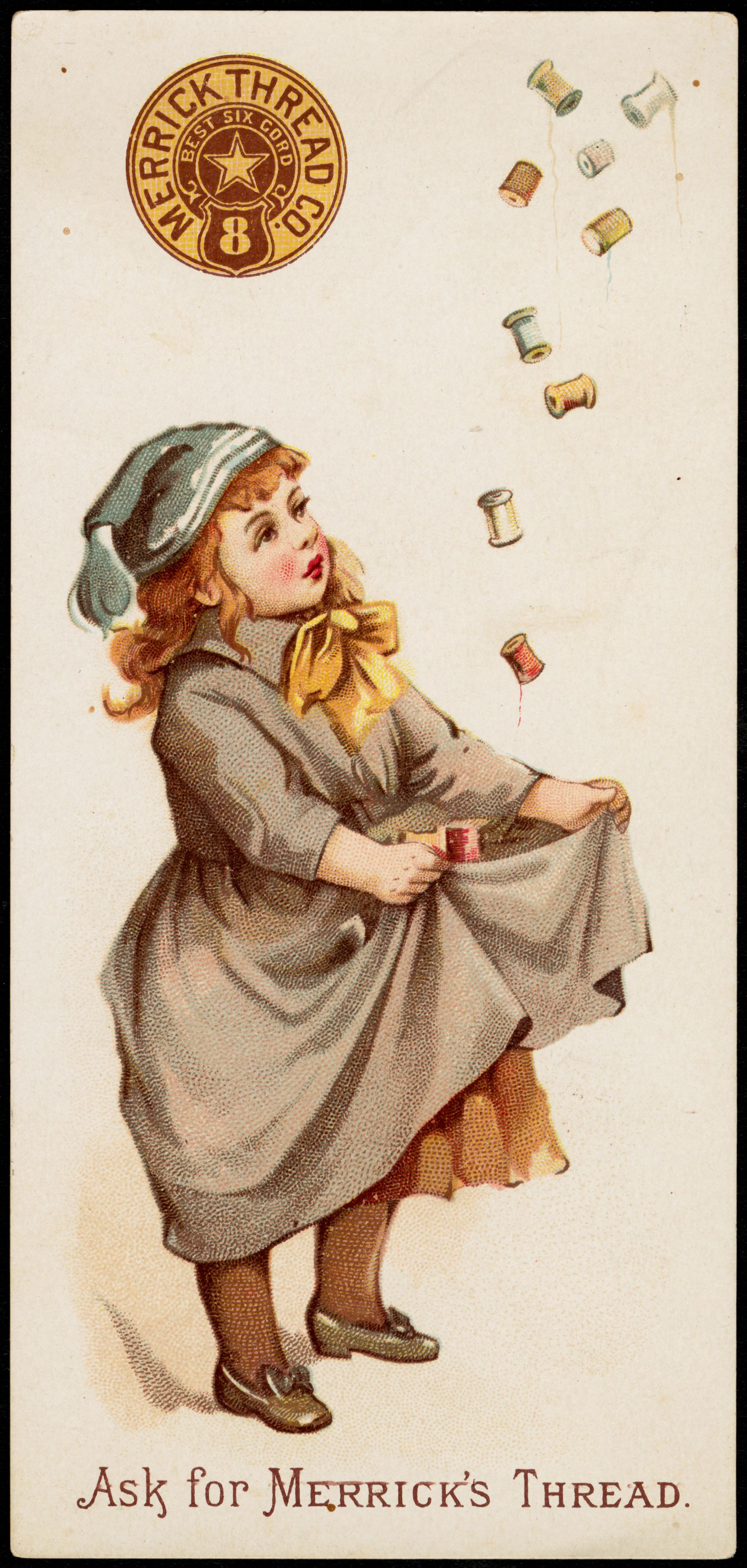
Ask for Merrick's thread, ca. 1870–1900; from the 19th Century American Trade Cards collection of the Boston Public Library

A thread is a long strand of material, often composed of several filaments or fibres, used for joining, creating or decorating textiles. Ancient Egyptians were known for creating thread using plant fibers, wool and hair. Today, thread can also be made of many different materials including but not limited to cotton, wool, flax, nylon, silk, polyester etc. There are also metal threads (sometimes used in decorative textiles), which can be made of fine wire.

Thread is similar to yarn, cord, twine, or string, and there is some overlap between the way these terms are used. However, thread is most often used to mean materials fine and smooth enough for sewing, embroidery, weaving, or making lace or net. Yarn is often used to mean a thicker and softer material, suitable for knitting and crochet. Cords, twines or strings are usually stronger materials, suitable for tying and fastening.

== Materials ==
Thread is made from a wide variety of materials. Where a thread is stronger than the material that it is being used to join, if seams are placed under strain the material may tear before the thread breaks. Garments are usually sewn with threads of lesser strength than the fabric so that if stressed the seam will break before the garment. Heavy goods that must withstand considerable stresses such as upholstery, car seating, tarpaulins, tents, and saddlery require very strong threads. Attempting repairs with light weight thread will usually result in rapid failure, though again, using a thread that is stronger than the material being sewn can end up causing rips in that material before the thread itself gives way.

Thread material
Material	Description	Purpose
Cotton	Spun traditional thread	general
Cotton/polyester	A cotton thread with a polyester core which is slightly stretchy but retains the traditional look of cotton	strength without sheen
Fusible	Fuses sewn fabrics together when ironed	binding and appliqué
Linen	A spun thread, typically in a thicker gauge than that used for fabric garments. It may be waxed for durability and resistance to mildew.	Traditional leather saddlery; leather luggage, handbags, and accessories; and beadwork.
Metallics	A delicate metallic coating protected by an outer coating providing extremely vibrant color/glitter and/or texture.	decoration
Nylon	A transparent monofillament which can be melted by an iron. Nylon is usually stronger than polyester.	strength with transparency
Polyester	A synthetic blend which is stronger and stretchier than cotton with little or no lint (may be texturized)	strength
Rayon	Made from cellulose, but not considered to be a natural fibre because it is highly processed. Useful for obtaining bright colors, though not always color-fast.	high sheen, soft texture
Silk	A very fine, strong and hard-to-see thread; tends to degrade over time, however.	high strength and often high sheen, used for attaching beads
Wool	A thicker thread.	homespun look, rougher texture, highly insulating, water absorbent
Water-soluble	Dissolves when washed	temporary basting

Polyester/polyester core spun thread is made by wrapping staple polyester around a continuous polyester filament during spinning and plying these yarns into a sewing thread.

== Measurement types and labeling ==
=== Thread gauges ===
Yarns are measured by the density of the yarn, which is described by various units of textile measurement relating to a standardized length per weight. These units do not directly correspond to thread diameter.

==== Weight (Wt.) and Gunze count ====
The most common weight system for thread specifies the length of the thread in kilometres required to weigh 1 kilogram. Therefore, a greater weight number (indicated in the American standard by the abbreviation wt) indicates a thinner, finer thread. The American standard of thread weight was adopted from the Gunze Count standard of Japan, which uses two numbers separated by a forward slash. The first number corresponds to the wt number of the thread and the second number indicates how many strands of fiber were used to compose the finished thread. It is common to wrap three strands of the same weight to make one thread, though this is not a formal requirement in the US standard (which is therefore less informative).

Thread Weight Table
	Weight	Gunze Count	Common Use
Light	60 wt	#60/3	bobbin or appliqué
Thin	50 wt	#50/3	bobbin or appliqué
Regular	40 wt	#40/3	Quilting
Upholstery	30 wt	#30/3	Decorative
Heavy	20 wt	#20/3	Decorative

==== Denier ====
A denier weight specification states how many grams 9,000 metres of the thread weighs. Unlike the common thread weight system, the greater the denier number, the thicker the thread. The denier weight system, like the common weight system, also specifies the number of strands of the specified weight which are wrapped together to make the finished thread. Only embroidery threads have their weights given in denier.

==== Tex ====
Tex is the mass in grams of 1,000 metres of thread. If 1,000 m weighs 25 g, it is a tex 25. Larger tex numbers are heavier threads. Tex is used throughout North America and Europe.

==== Silk machine twist ====
Manufacturers producing fine silk threads, apply their own scales of thread measurement using "aughts" or zeroes at the finest end and FFF at the other, thus scaling 000, 00, 0, A, B, C, D, E, F, FF, FFF. The three finest threads are described as having "three aughts", "two aughts", and "one aught" respectively, and as having different "aught counts". Within a given manufacturer's spectrum, a higher "aught count" indicates a finer thread: this may be given as a single digit followed by a forward slash and a zero— for example, 3/0 indicates a three-aught thread or a thread size "000", but this number only has significance when compared to other threads produced by the same manufacturer: one manufacturer's 3/0 will always be more fine than that same manufacturer's 2/0, but may not be comparable to the 3/0 of another manufacturer. Very roughly, however, size A is 900 yards per pound of thread, and every 100 yards difference is one letter size different. The size is always given for the overall thread, not its individual silk plies.

==== Commercial ====
Some heavier duty threads are given "commercial" size designations in set sizes of 30, 46, 69, 92, 138, 207, 277, 346, 415 and 554 only. Each of these numbers is merely the thread's denier size divided by 10. A commercial size 138 thread has a denier of 1380.

=== Conversion information ===
Thread weight conversion table

Conversion
From	To	Method
Weight	Denier	9000 / weight
Weight	Tex	1000 / weight
Denier	Weight	9000 / Denier
Denier	Tex	Denier / 9
Tex	Denier	Tex x 9
Tex	Weight	1000 / Tex
Commercial	Denier	Commercial x 10
Denier	Commercial	Denier / 10
Commercial	Tex	Commercial / 9 x 10
Tex	Commercial	Tex / 10 x 9

For example: 40 weight = 225 denier = tex 25 = [theoretical] commercial 27.8 .

Thread weight ranges usually cover different applications, such as:

- Tex 8 threads are used in blindstitching and felling machines
- Tex 13 for some fine serging threads
- Tex 25 to 30 for general sewing thread
- Tex 40 would be a common weight for a heavier silk buttonhole thread suitable for bartacking, small leather items, and decorative seams
- Tex 75 is appropriate for upholstery
- Tex 100, in heavy-duty topstitching threads for coats, bags, and shoes
- Tex 265 to 299, topstitching threads suitable for luggage and tarpaulins

=== Labeling ===
Threads of different composition and construction may be labeled in a variety of ways. Most threads are composed of 2 or more "plies" of fiber, and this information is often provided on thread packaging along with the finalized thread's weight, according to a particular scale of measurement. The actual physical diameter of a thread is not recorded and is unhelpful.

Spools may have codes that indicate their fiber content as well such a "P" for polyester. If a fiber content is given in the label code, it will be the first piece if information located there.

==== Examples ====
Code	Meaning
120D/2	Spool is 120 denier thread composed of 2 plies (each of 60 denier)
50S/3	Spool has a weight of 50 and is composed of 3 plies whose individual weights are not indicated
P60/3	This is a spool of polyester thread of weight 60 and is made up of 3 plies
Den 75/2	Spool of 75 denier thread made of 2 plies
#60/2	This is the spool's Gunze count: the spool has thread of 2 plies of 60 weight thread each

Sometimes a manufacturer does not provide any weight specification at all on its spools and instead provides only the fiber content and spool length such as "100% Silk 250 m". This means only that the spool has 250 meters of pure silk, but does not indicate how many plies make up that thread nor what the plies' or the combined thread's weight is.

==== Cotton count ====
The cotton count system is based on the number of 840 yard hanks that will result from a single pound of a particular finished thread. This is the non-metric equivalent of the Gunze count, and is given with two numbers separated by a slash: the first is the size of the thread and the second is the number of plies of that size used in the finished thread. The cotton count was developed for the cotton industry, but cotton counts are also frequently given for polyester and polyester/ cotton blends as well.

==== Hong Kong ticket ====
A Hong Kong ticket number, when present, is a cotton count number without the slash and with the final number always indicating the number of plies if more than one. A Hong Kong ticket number of 1002 is made of two plies of size 100 thread; a number of 100 is made of a single ply of size 100 thread; a size 503 is made of three plies of size 50 thread.

==== Single's equivalent ====
A spool of thread may be described in terms of its "single's equivalent". This is the cotton count size of the thread divided by the number of plies which make it up. A spool of 30/3 thread has a single's equivalent of 10, because a single strand or ply of that thread has a cotton count size of 10. A 20/2 spool has the same single's equivalent as a 30/3, but a 30/2 spool has a single's equivalent of 15, which means it is heavier than a 30/3 spool.

== High-temperature sewing threads ==
High temperature sewing threads provide durability and resistance to extreme temperatures. Some threads can be used for applications up to 800 °C (1472 °F). There are a variety of different sewing threads available which have different applications and benefits.

Kevlar-coated stainless steel sewing threads have a high-temperature and flame-resistant steel core combined with Kevlar coating designed to facilitate easier machine sewing. The stainless steel core has a temperature resistance of up to 800 °C (1472 °F) and the Kevlar coating is heat-resistant up to 220 °C (428 °F).

PTFE coated glass sewing threads have an excellent temperature resistance combined with a PTFE coating to provide easier machine sewing. The glass core has a temperature resistance of up to 550 °C (1022 °F) and the PTFE coating is heat-resistant up to 230 °C (446 °F).

Nomex sewing threads are inherently flame-retardant and heat-resistant with a tough protective coating that resists abrasion during the sewing operation. It is temperature resistant up to 370 °C (698 °F).

Bonded nylon sewing threads are tough, coated with abrasion resistance, rot proofing, and have good tensile strength for lower temperature applications. They are temperature-resistant up to 120 °C (248 °F).

Bonded polyester sewing threads are tough, coated with abrasion resistance, rot proofing, and have exceptional tensile strength for lower temperatures but heavier-duty sewing operations. They are temperature-resistant up to 120 °C (248 °F).

== See also ==
- Eisengarn ('iron yarn')
- Hank (textile)
- Sewing needle
- Staple (textiles)
- Stitch (textile arts)
