= Twine =

Cord composed of two or more thinner strands twisted together

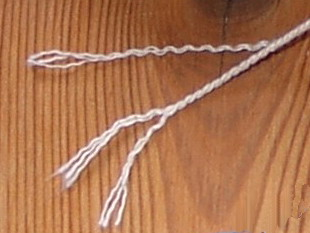
Twine showing component strands

Twine is a strong thread, light string or cord composed of string in which two or more thinner strands are twisted, and then twisted together (plied). The strands are plied in the opposite direction to that of their twist, which adds torsional strength to the cord and keeps it from unravelling. This process is sometimes called reverse wrap. The same technique used for making twine is also used to make thread, which is thinner, yarn, and rope, which is stronger and thicker, generally with three or more strands.

Natural fibres used for making twine include wool, cotton, sisal, jute, hemp, henequen, paper, and coir. A variety of synthetic fibres are also used. Twine is a popular substance used in modern-day crafting.

== Prehistoric ==
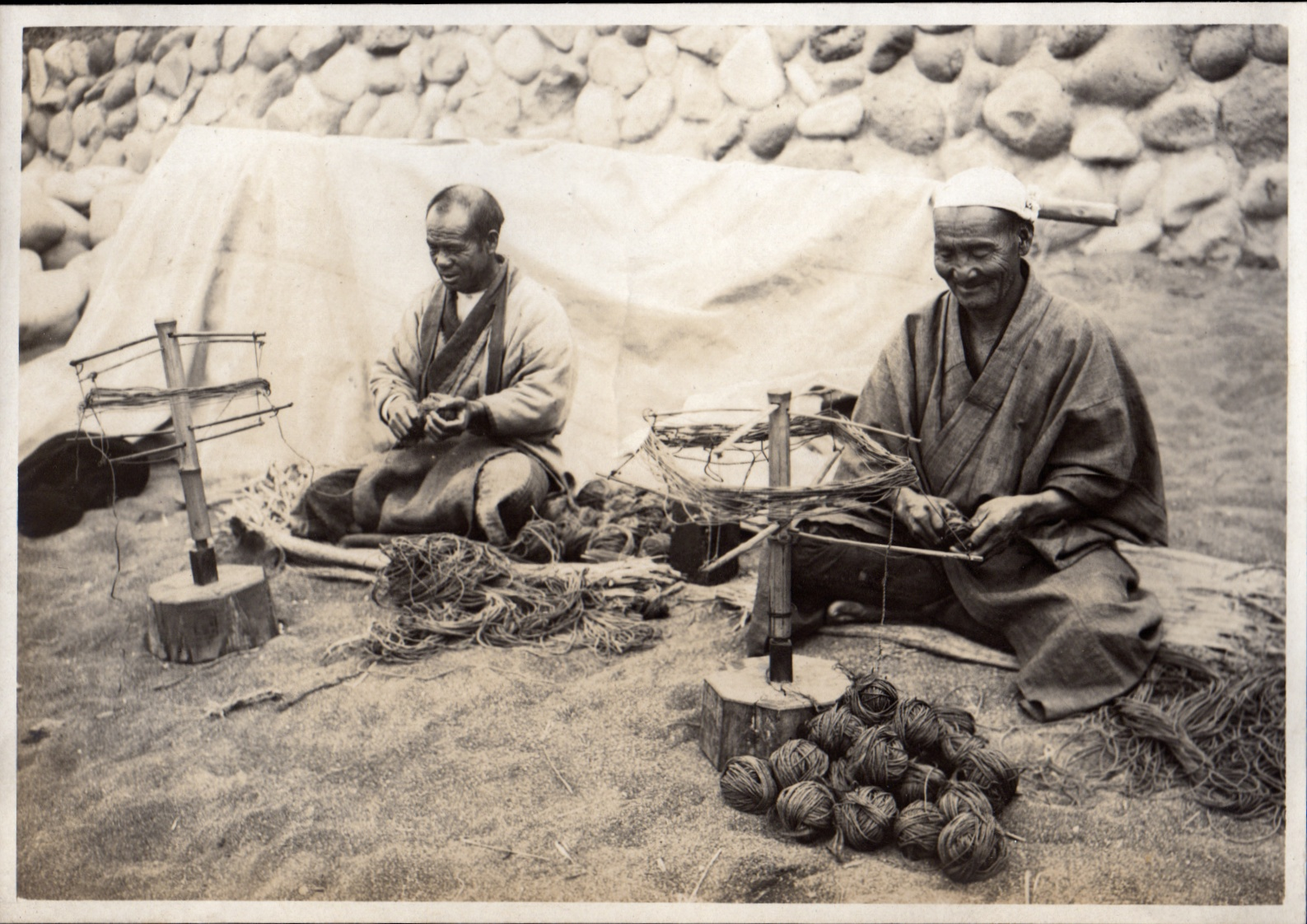
Men making twine. Japan, 1915

The invention of twine is at least as important as the development of stone tools for early humans. Indeed, Elizabeth Wayland Barber has called the development of twine, which can be made far stronger and longer than its component fibers, "the string revolution." Twine could be used to fasten points and blades to arrows, spears, harpoons and other tools and to make snares, bags, baby slings, fishing and hunting nets and marine tackle, not to mention to secure firewood, haul goods and anchor tents and shelters. Twine is the foundation to both textile and rope making. Twine has been made of animal hair, including human, sinews and plant material, often from the vascular tissue of a plant (known as bast), but also bark and even seed down, e.g. milkweed. However, unlike stone or metal tools, most twine is missing from the archaeological record because it is made of perishable materials that rarely survive over time. In fact, the discovery of ancient beads and the dating of sea travel to at least 60,000 years ago suggests that the "string revolution" might have occurred much earlier than the Upper Paleolithic. Plant twine was used for hafting stone tips by about 58,000 years ago in southern Africa.

Paleolithic cord remnants have been discovered in a few places: Georgia's Dzudzuana Cave (30,000 years old), Israel's Ohalo II site (19,000 years old), and France's Lascaux Cave (17,000 years old). In 2016, a carved piece of mammoth ivory with three holes, dated at 40,000 years old, was unearthed at the Hohle Fels site, famous for the discovery of both Paleolithic female figurines and flutes. It has been identified as a tool for twining rope. In the Americas, multiple pieces of cordage and of textiles woven in several different patterns using both simple and diagonal twining have been found at the Windover Pond site, in Florida, dating to more than 7000 years ago. A small piece of cord discovered at Abris du Muras, in south-eastern France, has been dated to around 50,000 years ago.

Early depictions of twine are few, but one of the around 200 Venus figurines that have been found across Eurasia is depicted as wearing a "string skirt" (the Venus of Lespugue, dated to 25,000 years ago). Barber notes that not only is each twist in the strings carved in detail, but also "the bottom end of each string [is shown] fraying out into a mass of loose fibers (not possible for e.g. a twisted piece of gut or sinew)."

Other evidence for the prehistoric use of twine is provided by impressions on metal or in pottery and other ceramic artifacts. In the Fukui cave, Japan, such impressions date to 13,000 years ago. Imprints of woven material in clay found at Dolni Vestonice I and several other sites in Moravia date to 26,000 years ago. and were found along with needles and tools that were used to sew clothing and make nets for hunting small animals and birds.

Beads, as well as shells and animal teeth with man-made holes, have also been used as indirect evidence of twining, as have net sinkers and tools with the marks of cord wear. Beads have been found with the remnants of thread still trapped inside them.

== Historical manufacture ==
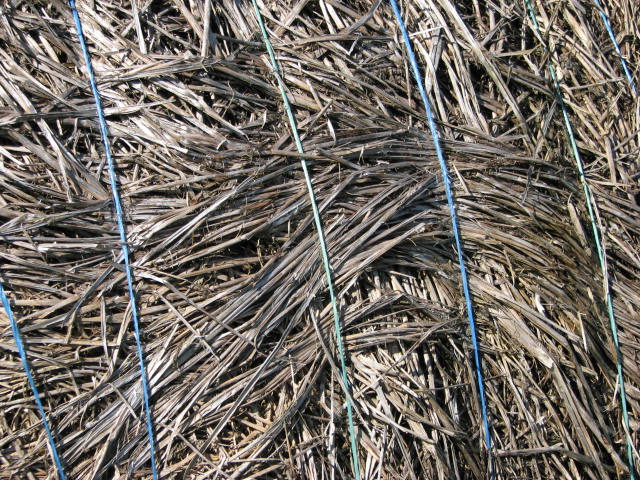
Binder twine securing a hay bale

After the technique of making twine by hand was invented, various implements to produce thread for textile production such as spindles, spinning wheels and looms for spinning and weaving and tools for twine and rope-making were developed.

== Process ==
The twine making process begins with cordage, which can be any form of untwisted, twisted or braided combination of fibers. A cord is formed by the twisting of at least one ply of material or the braiding together of multiple plies. The number of plies and the type of material lends itself to the naming of the type and structure of the cord. A simple ply is one that is made from a single strand or bunch of material that is spun in the same direction whereas a compound ply is created by twisting several strands or bunches of material individually and then spinning those together in opposite directions to one another.

A weaving technique characterised by the use of two weft "threads" twisted together as they traverse the warp "threads" is called twining. Typically used to produce course handmade textiles, basketry and brush fencing. There is a certain structural advantage gained by twining because the pairs of weft "threads" are effectively interlocked with each other in the process.

The primary constituents of this weaving process are known as the warp and weft or the foundation and stitch. Objects created with this method using varying techniques may also host unique structural decoration. Systematic passing of the warp can create images or patterned modifications. In accompaniment of warp modifications, dyed or naturally coloured materials may be used to accumulate patterns. Textural differences may be created in twined objects by intentional spacing of strands implemented in the weave. Lastly, other auxiliary materials can be incorporated into the object for further detail such as embroidery, feathers, appliques, etc.

== Classifications ==
There are several primary means of classifying objects such as threads, textiles and baskets created with twining. The way that the weft rows are spaced can be defined as open, closed or a combination of the two. These terms identify the closeness of the weft rows to one another and variation in this intentional spacing. The way that the warp and weft are interconnected creates different compositional arrangements. These arrangements can be simple, diagonal or both. The last main categorization comes from the direction that the weft is twisted. This is denoted as S-twist and Z-twist or both. In the S-twist the strands appear to come up as they are twisted left and the Z-twist appears to come up as they are twisted to the right.

Additional classifications that are typically recorded by anthropologists can include the width of the strands, the number of strands being used together to form the warp or weft, the number of warp and weft rows per unit centimeter, and the width of the gaps in the weft rows. Methods of preparation, composition, and creation are also of great importance.

== See also ==
- Biggest ball of twine
- Binder Twine Festival
- Hair twists
- International Year of Natural Fibres 2009
- Rope
- String
- Timeline of clothing and textiles technology
