= Winter clothing =

Clothes worn in cold weather

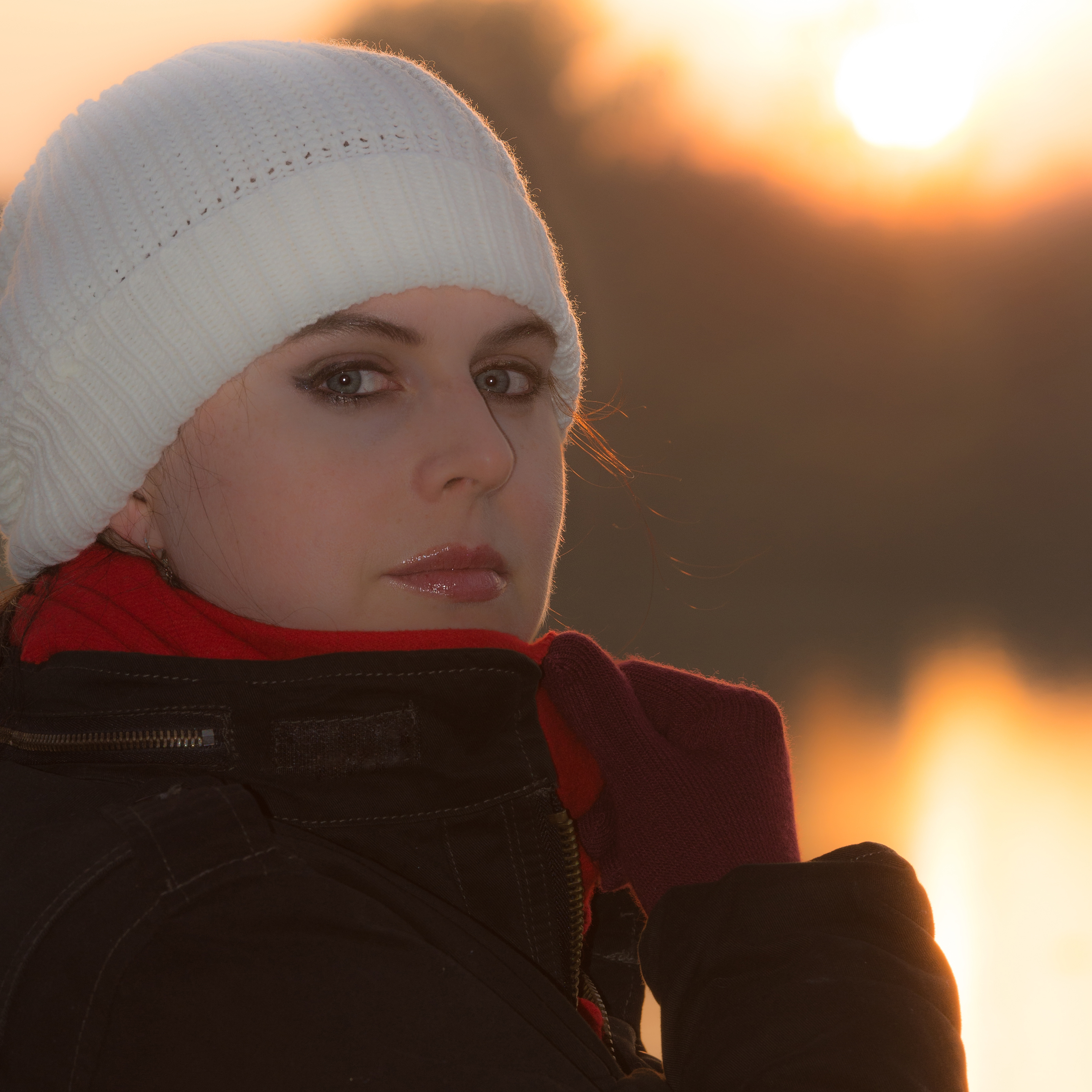
Basic items like knitted wool cap and gloves, scarf and high neck jacket

Winter clothing are clothes used for protection against the particularly cold weather of winter. Often they have a good water resistance, consist of multiple layers to protect and insulate against low temperatures.

Winter clothes are especially outerwear like coats, jackets, hats, scarves and gloves or mittens, earmuffs, but also warm underwear like long underwear, union suits, snow boots and socks. Military issue winter clothing evolved from heavy coats and jackets to multilayered clothing for the purpose of keeping troops warm during winter battles. Several shirts and socks, usually four pairs were standard issue for the U.S. Army during WWII. Winter clothes used for sports and recreation includes ski suits, winter gloves, scarves, and snowmobile suits. Many northern cultures use animal fur to make winter clothes.

== Materials ==
=== Types of thermal insulation ===
- PrimaLoft
- Thinsulate
- Down feathers
- Polyester
- Polarloft
- Thermoball by North Face
- Climashield Apex
- Coreloft Compact
- Omni-Heat by Columbia
- Marmot's Thermal R
- Arc'teryx's Coreloft

=== Types of waterproof, windproof & breathable shell ===
- Expanded polyethylene

== Gallery ==
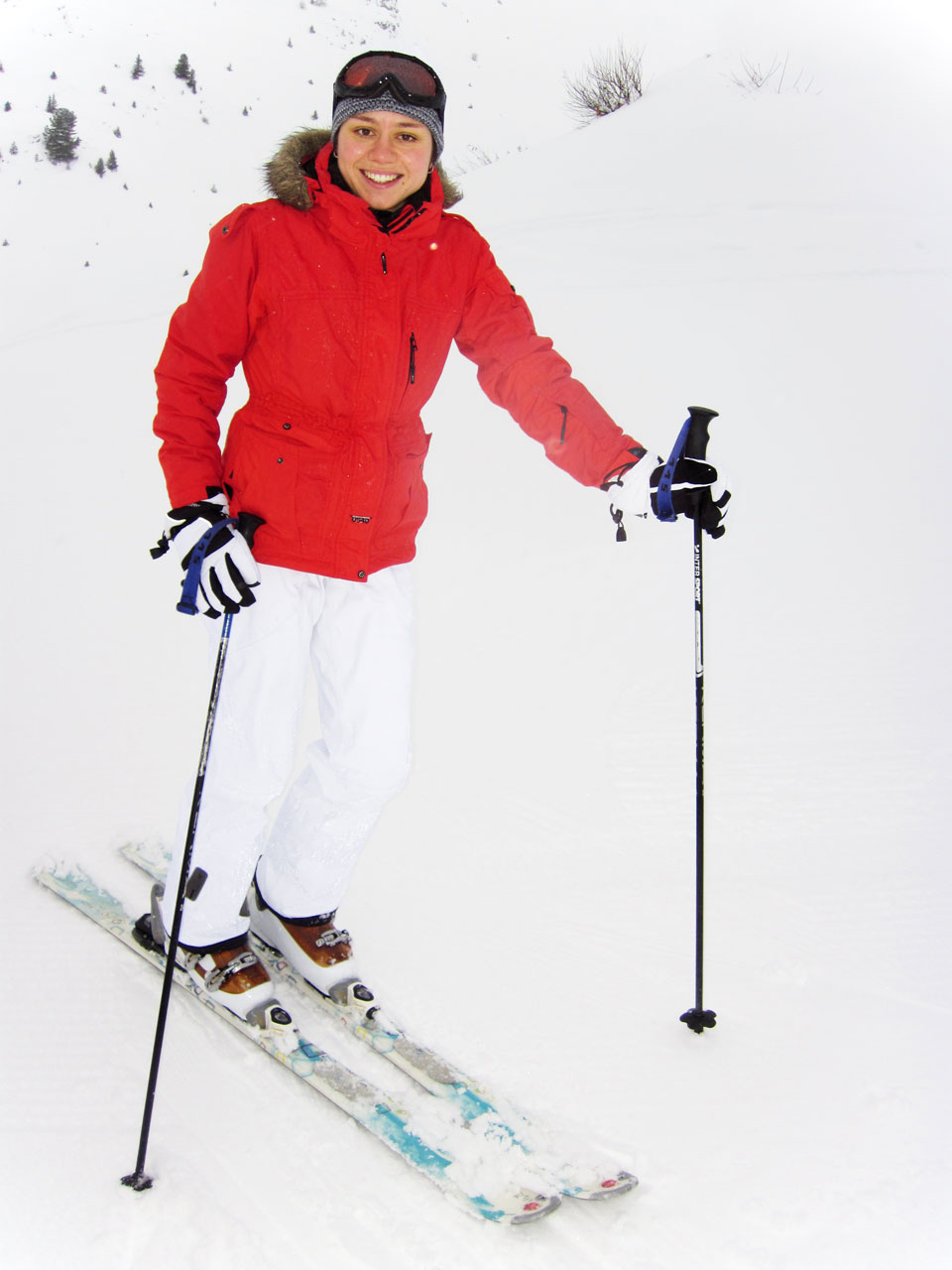
A female skier in winter clothes: jacket, hat, thick gloves, warm pants and ski boots

Finnish Children in winter clothes 1980s

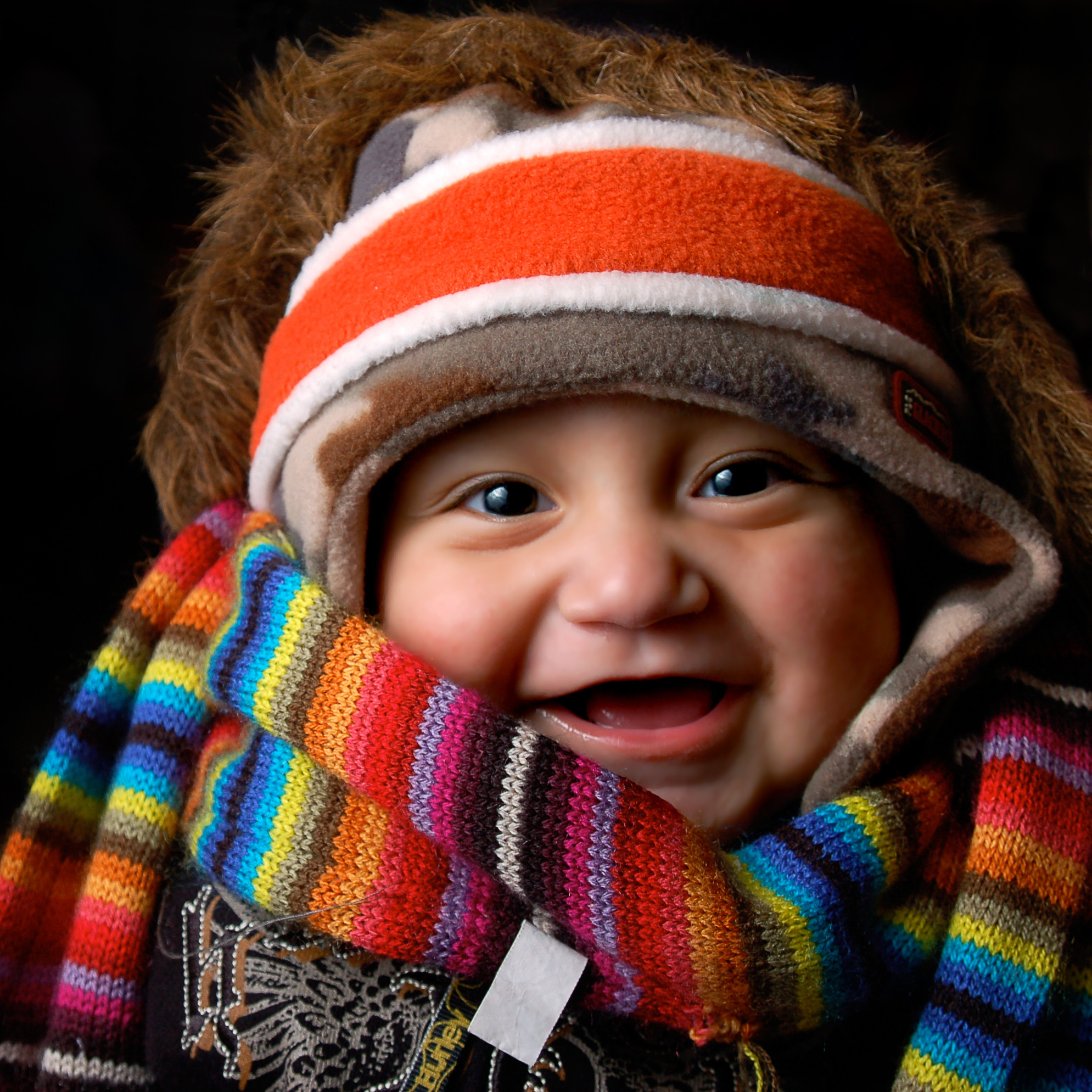
A baby wearing many items of winter clothing: headband, cap, fur-lined coat, shawl and sweater

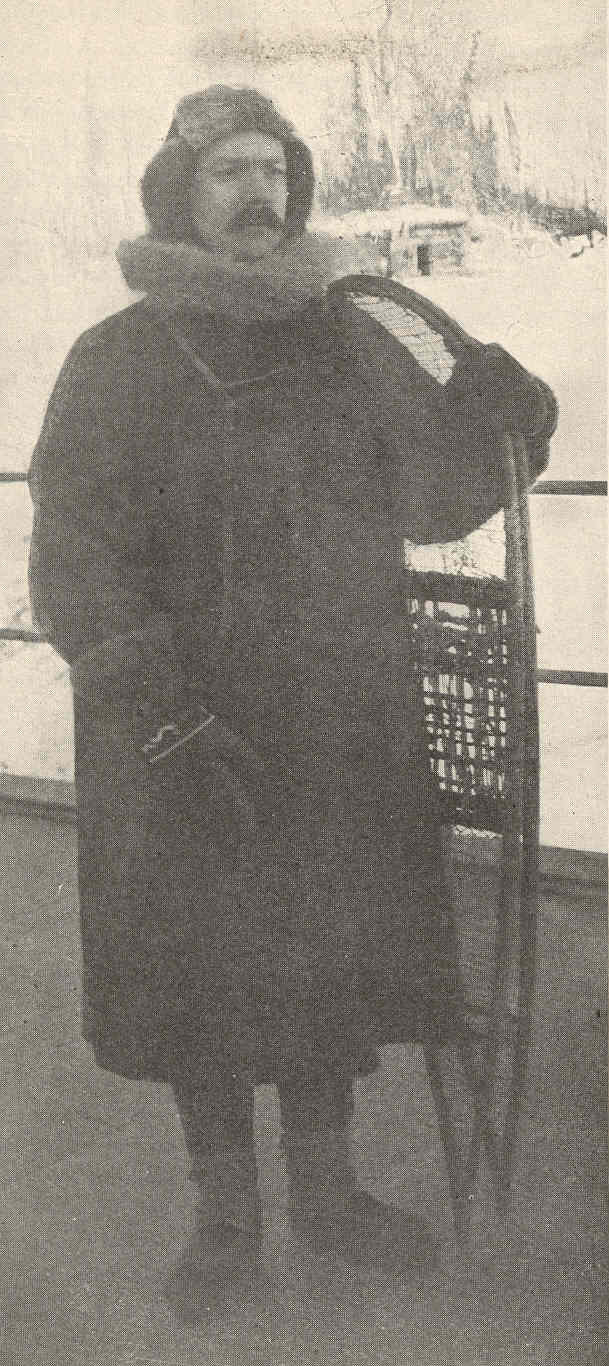
Customary winter dress in the Yukon Valley

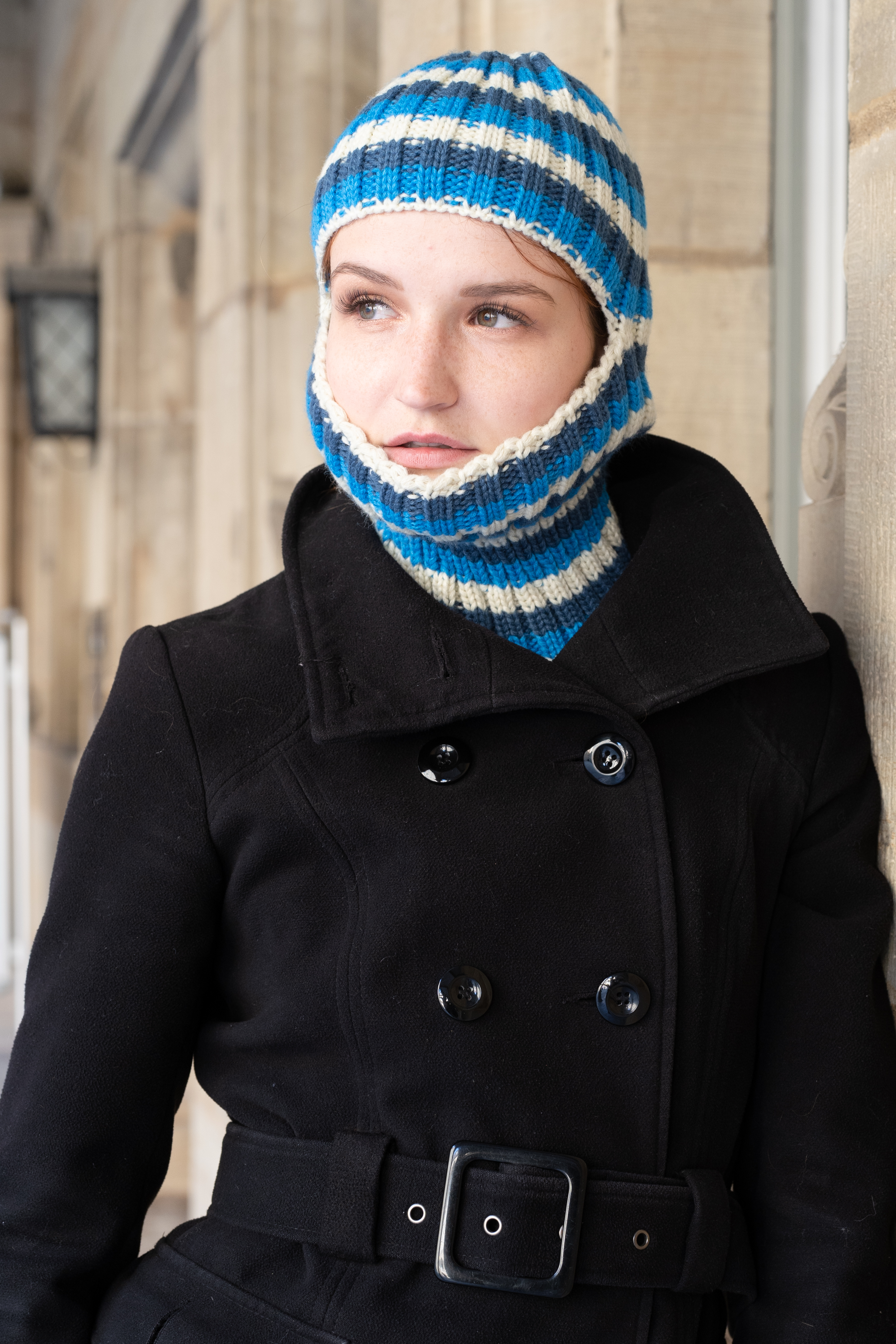
Woman wearing a versatile balaclava and wool coat

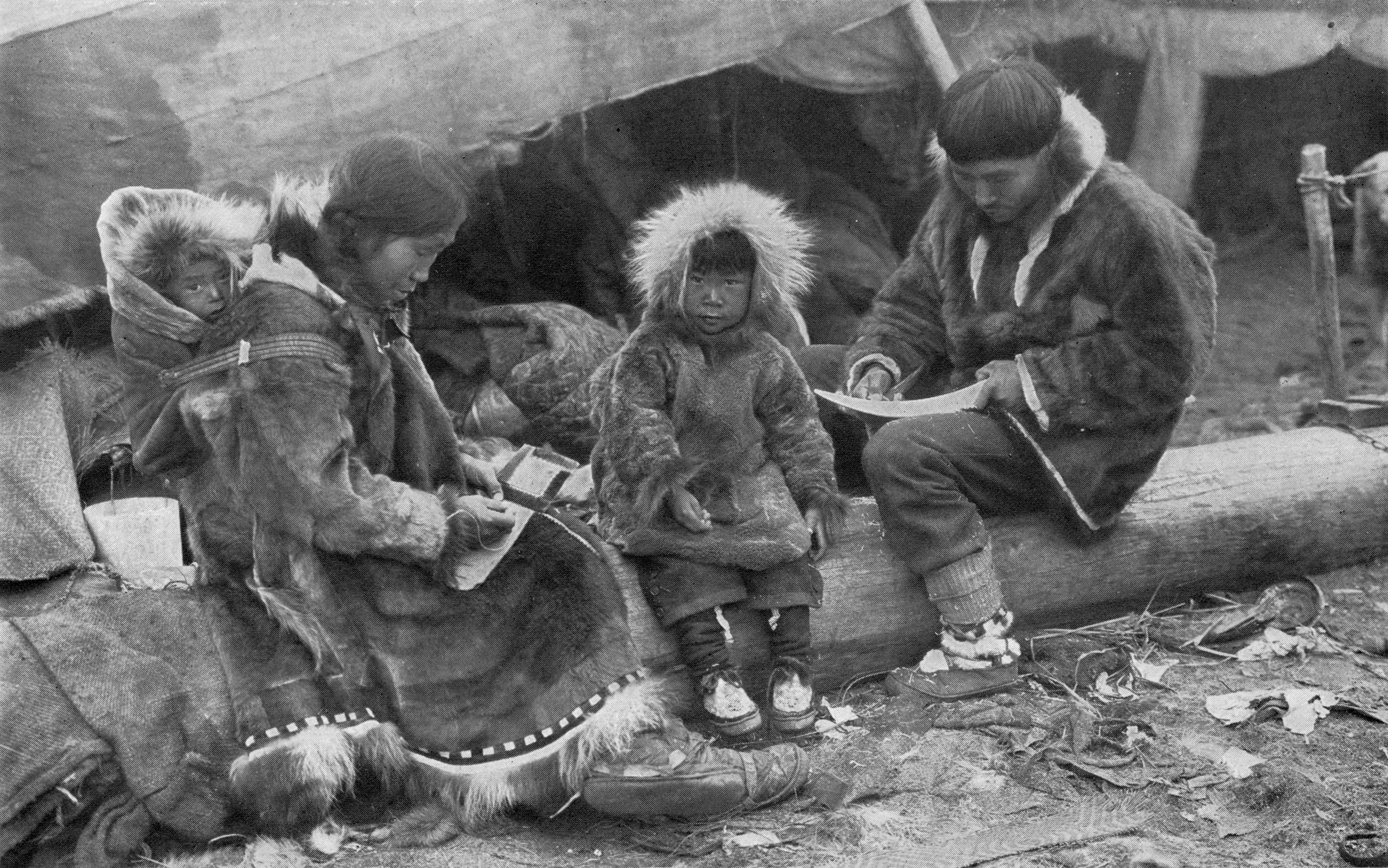
Traditional Inuit clothing

== See also ==
- Outerwear
- Ski suit
- Jacket
- Ushanka
- Selbuvott
