= PrimaLoft =

Brand of insulation materials

- Type: Subsidiary
- Industry: Manufacturing
- Founded: 1983
- Headquarters: Latham, New York, United States
- Products: Synthetic insulation
- Parent: PrimaLoft, Inc.
- Website: primaloft.com

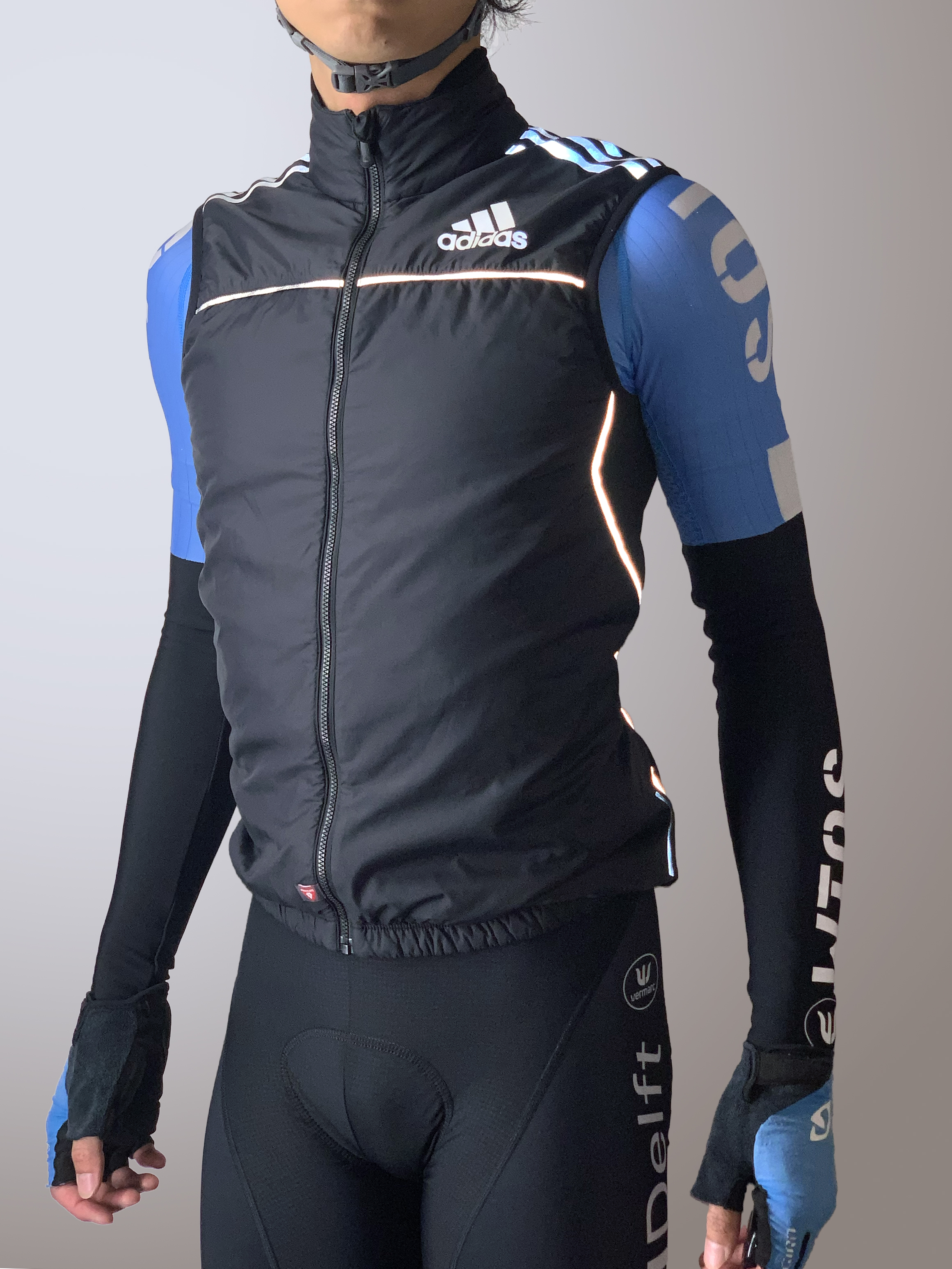
A Primaloft insulated cycling gilet from Adidas.

PrimaLoft is a brand of patented synthetic microfiber thermal insulation material that was developed for the United States Army in the 1980s. PrimaLoft is a registered trademark of PrimaLoft, Inc., the brand's parent company.

PrimaLoft synthetic insulation is used in winter clothing, outerwear, gloves, sleeping bags, and footwear. It is also used as a down alternative in pillows, comforters, and mattress toppers.

== History ==
In 1983 the U.S. Army Research Laboratory in Natick, MA approached PrimaLoft's former parent company Albany International Corp., a global advanced textile and material processing company, to develop a water resistant synthetic alternative to goose down for use in military sleeping bags and clothing systems in variable environmental conditions. The U.S. Army was primarily interested in a synthetic insulation that would be comparable to goose down in weight, compressibility, and warmth, but also retain heat while in the presence of moisture. In 1985, United States Patent 4,588,635 for "synthetic down" was filed and ultimately approved in May 1986. This original non-woven insulation would eventually be renamed as PrimaLoft ONE. PrimaLoft was then established as a business subsidiary of Albany International Corp. in 1988 for commercialization.

In 1989, the first commercially available PrimaLoft insulated garment was manufactured by L.L.Bean. A 1990 New York Times article titled "Outdoor Wear: Sorting Out the Choices" featured statements by Edward Howell, then L.L. Bean's director of product development, describing PrimaLoft insulation as a high-loft synthetic alternative to down with similar performance dry, but superior performance wet. Since then, PrimaLoft has gone on to become a major supplier of high performance, technical insulation for the outdoor industry.

In 2007, PrimaLoft introduced a product extension of yarn. The yarn is 100% polyester or a blend of 45% polyester fibers and 55% merino wool, and is used in socks, sweaters, base layers, and accessories intended mainly for outdoor wear.

In 2010, PrimaLoft was the first maker of branded insulation to be recognized for compliance with the Bluesign system for sustainable textile production. In 2015, PrimaLoft was the largest global supplier of bluesign approved insulation.

On June 29, 2012, PrimaLoft, Inc. completed the acquisition of the assets of PrimaLoft® from former parent Albany International Corp. The company then became a privately held company as a result of the transaction. PrimaLoft, Inc. moved its headquarters to Latham, NY in December 2013.

In October, 2017, PrimaLoft, Inc. was acquired by an investor group led by private equity firm Victor Capital Partners, in partnership with Allstate's private equity group.

== Thermal performance ==
Wool has traditionally been regarded as a good material to use for cold, wet weather due to its ability to provide insulation when wet. In cold and dry areas, down provides warmth and comfort but it becomes a liability when it gets wet. The design goal of PrimaLoft was to create a fabric that would offer the same level of insulation effectiveness as down, even when wet.

The original patent filed for PrimaLoft insulation, known as "Synthetic Down" and filed in May 1986, describes a particular mix of synthetic microfibers and macrofibers that compares favorably to down. It was proven to provide an equally efficient thermal barrier, be of equivalent density, possess similar compressional properties, have improved wetting and drying characteristics, and have superior loft retention when wet. However, down still has a better weight to warmth performance when dry.

Unlike down, synthetic insulation like PrimaLoft is able to retain 96% of its insulating capability when wet by maintaining its loft, and therefore is used in clothing and equipment intended to be used in cold, wet conditions, such as jackets, parkas, gloves, sleeping bags and footwear. The warmth of clothing is influenced by the type of synthetic insulation used and its thickness, with thicker insulation trapping more heat.

== Products ==
PrimaLoft first introduced a product containing post-consumer recycled content in 2007, meant for footwear applications.

In 2016, PrimaLoft introduced a synthetic insulation product for apparel containing 55% post-consumer recycled content. This application was first used by Patagonia in their Nano Puff line of products.

In 2018, PrimaLoft announced three insulation products made from 100% post-consumer recycled content and a synthetic insulation made from biodegradable fibers.

=== Yarn ===
Products made of PrimaLoft Yarn are available in 100% polyester or a blend of 45% polyester and 55% merino wool, both of which provide high levels of thermal comfort and moisture management for the end user.

PrimaLoft was introduced into new yarn product segments as follows:

- 2006: Socks by L.L. Bean
- 2010: Sweaters by ExOfficio
- 2011: Base Layer by Adidas Outdoor

== Certifications ==
Third party testing and certification of Primaloft includes:

- Thermal performance validations at Hohenstein Institute in Bonnigheim, Germany
- Thermal performance testing at Kansas State University’s textile and apparel research institutions
- ISO 11092 certification for thermal wet/dry performance
- Oeko-tex standard 100 environmental evaluation standard
- bluesign certification for environmental impact
- Global Recycled Standard for third-party certification of recycled content, chain of custody, social and environmental practices and chemical restrictions.
- ASTM D5511 testing for biodegradable fiber technology

== Care ==
Garments made with synthetic insulation like PrimaLoft are generally machine washable in cool to warm water with a mild detergent. Garments can be tumble dried at low temperatures. Using bleach and fabric softener should be avoided. Specific care instructions vary per garment.

== See also ==
- Thinsulate
