= Drawstring =

String, rope, or lace used to gather material

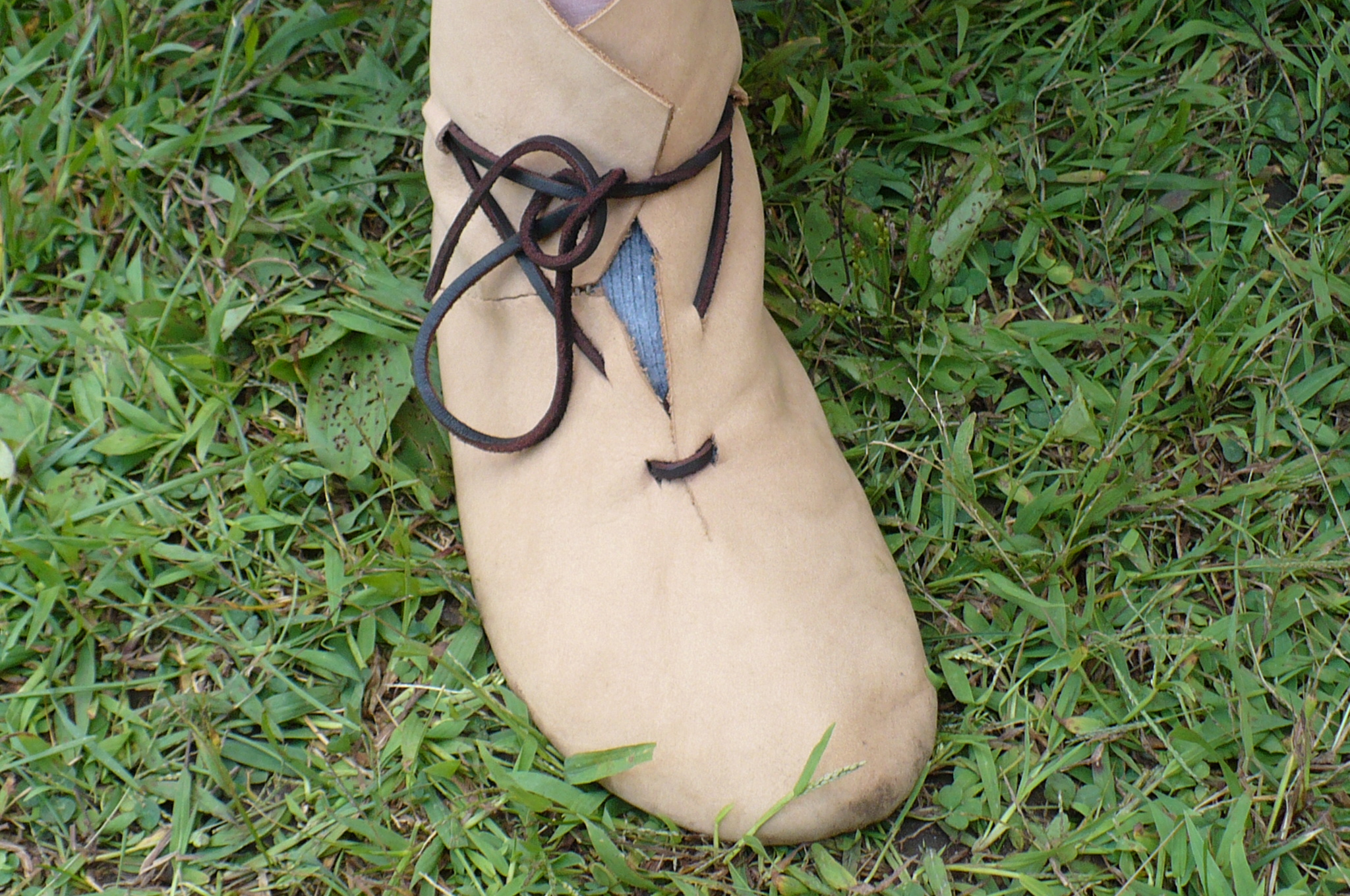
A modern reproduction of a medieval turn-shoe with a drawstring

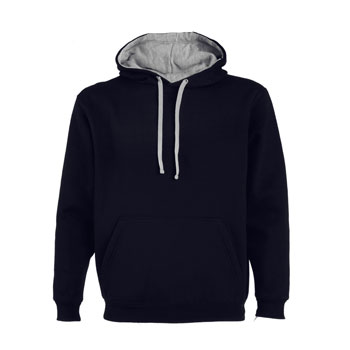
Hoodie with drawstring

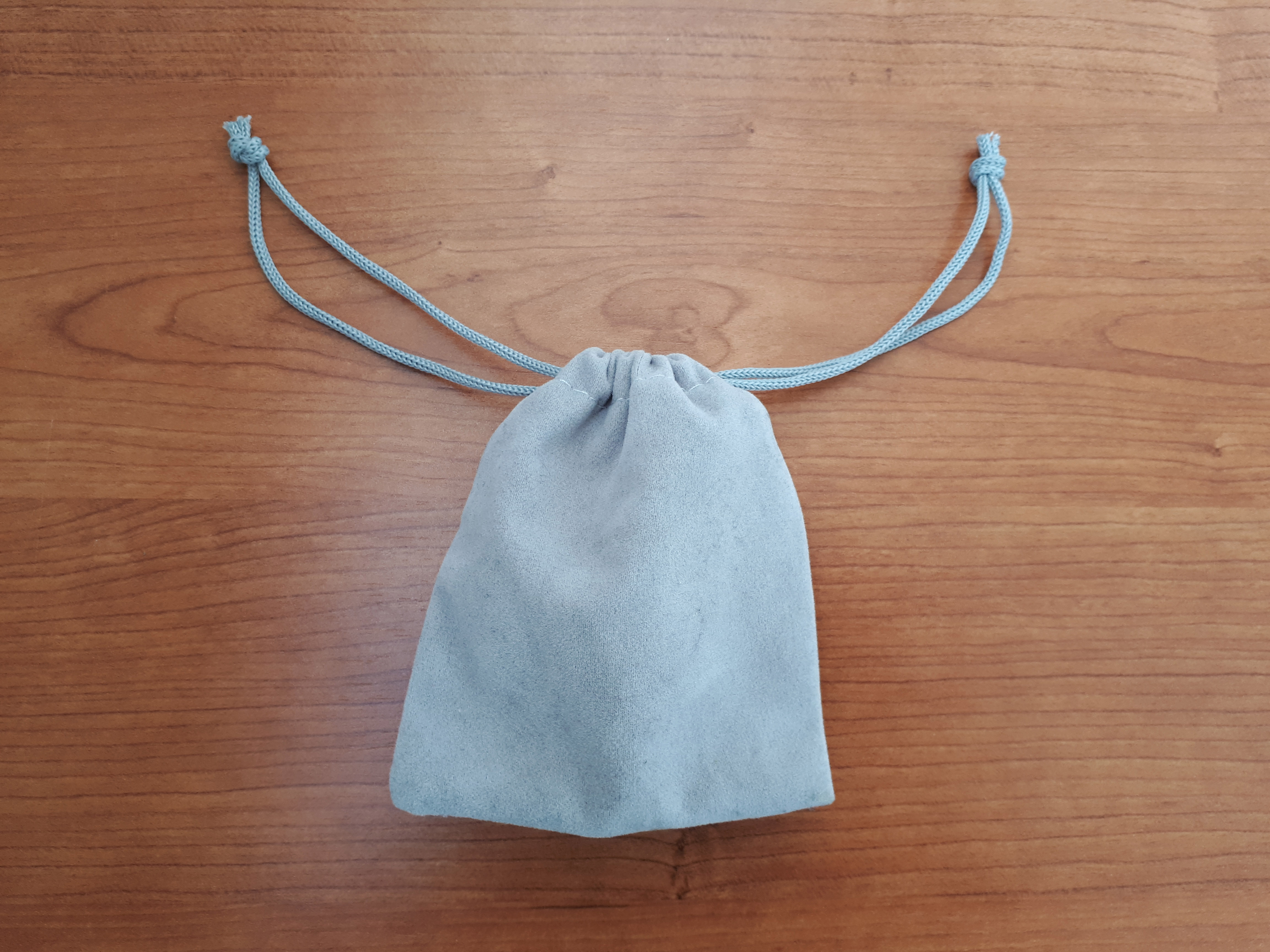
A bag with a drawstring

A drawstring (draw string, draw-string) is a string, rope or lace used to "draw" (gather, or shorten) fabric or other material. Ends of a drawstring are often terminated with a sheath called an aglet. The ends may be tied to hold the drawstring in place (and simultaneously close an opening). Alternatively, it may be kept drawn using a cordlock. Typically, the drawstring is loose when not being used and tightened when needed during use.

A drawstring may be threaded through a hem or casing (a continuous tube of material) or laced through holes, which may be lined with eyelets. A shoelace is a drawstring. It may also be laced through loops attached to the material, in the same way that belt loops are. A belt is a usually flat drawstring.

== Hazard ==
In 1996 the United States Consumer Product Safety Commission (CPSC) issued guidelines for drawstrings on children's upper outerwear to help prevent children from strangling or getting entangled on the neck and waist drawstrings of upper outerwear garments, such as jackets and sweatshirts. Drawstrings on children's clothing are a hidden hazard that can lead to deaths and injuries when they catch on such items as playground equipment, bus doors, or cribs. From 1985 to 1999, the CPSC received reports of 22 deaths and 48 non-fatal incidents involving the entanglement of children's clothing drawstrings. In 2006, the CPSC issued a letter to manufacturers, retailers, and importers of children's upper outwear garments, urging them to make certain the garments do not have hood drawstrings that can pose a strangulation hazard to children. Several product recalls due to possible strangulation hazards have occurred.

== Similarity in nature ==
In biology, a type of protein in the Rho family of GTPases heals wounds by contraction, much like a draw-string being pulled to close a bag.
