= Pertex =

Japanese textile brand

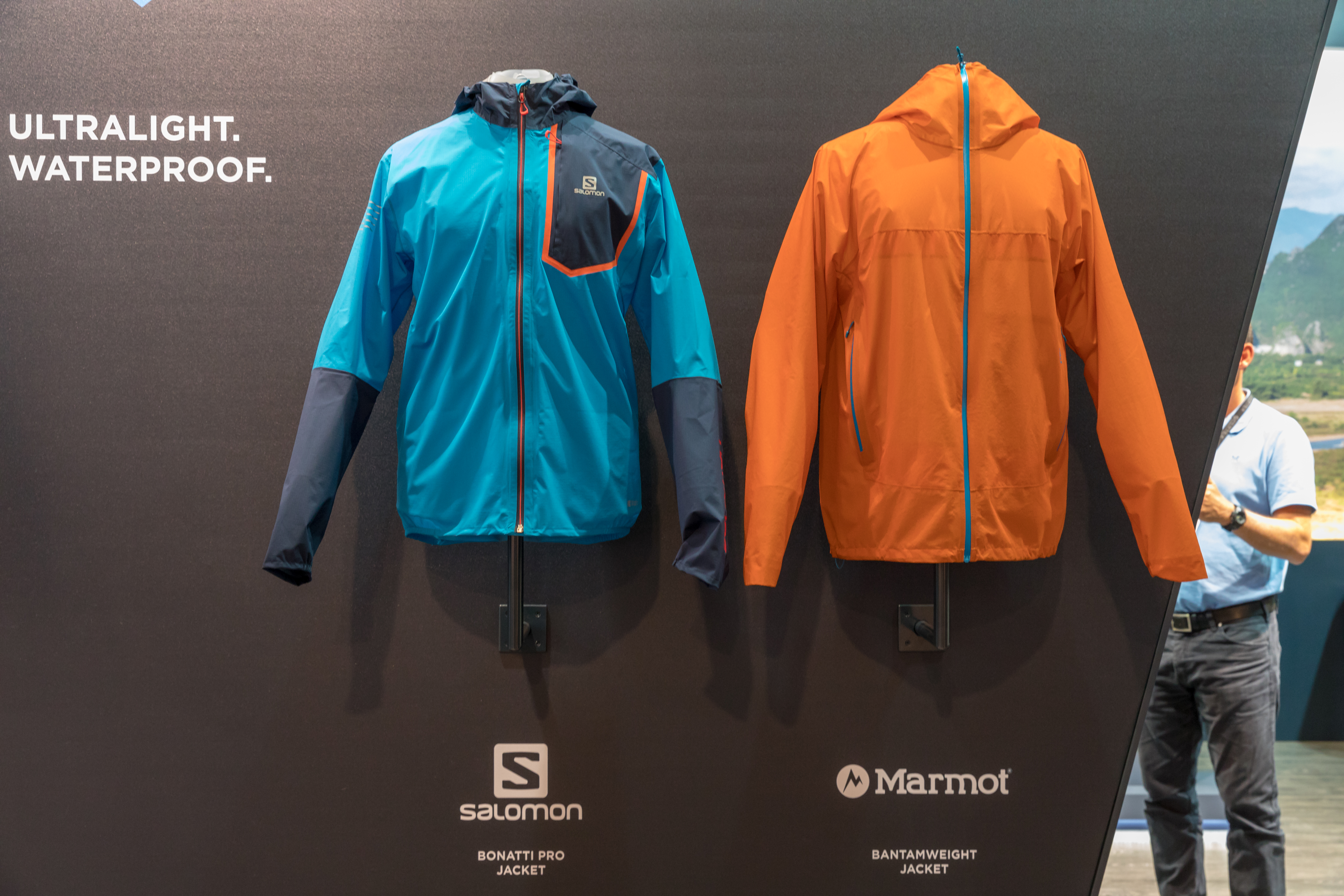
Different jackets made from Pertex fabric

Pertex is a brand of lightweight, synthetic fabrics typically used in outdoor and sports apparel. Originally established by Perseverance Mills Ltd. of Padiham, England, the brand is now owned by Mitsui & Co. of Japan.

== History ==
The brand was established in 1979 by Perseverance Mills Ltd., primarily an industrial textile manufacturer specialising in ribbons for dot matrix printers along with parachute canopy fabrics and other products. The mill was approached by Hamish Hamilton, a climber and mountaineer, with a concept for a new fabric. Hamish's original idea for Pertex was a high-density fabric, woven from multifilament synthetic yarns, with the goal of providing a wind-resistant, shell fabric capable of transporting moisture through capillary action. The first products to use Pertex fabrics were the pile-lined sleeping bags made by Buffalo Systems Ltd. in Sheffield.

Subsequently, using the heat calendering expertise developed as parachute canopy fabric manufacturers, Perseverance Mills Ltd. began to produce downproof Pertex fabrics for down jackets and sleeping bags. The process of heat calendering reduces the interstices between the yarns of the fabric, resulting in fabrics with low air permeability and high resistance to down and fibre migration.

In 2005, Perseverance Mills Ltd. went into liquidation and the Pertex trademarks were acquired by Mitsui & Co.

== Products ==
The Pertex brand now includes a number of sub-brands including:

- Pertex Quantum - Down and fibre proof fabrics.
- Pertex Quantum Pro - Coated down and fibre proof fabrics.
- Pertex Quantum Air - High air permeability fabrics.
- Pertex Shield - Laminated and coated waterproof breathable fabrics
- Pertex Shield Pro - Laminated waterproof breathable fabrics
- Pertex Equilibrium - Double weave fabrics

Pertex fabrics are used by a number of brands including Macpac, The North Face, Patagonia, Marmot, Rab, Mammut, Salomon, Outdoor Research, Kathmandu and others.
