= Sleeping bag liner =

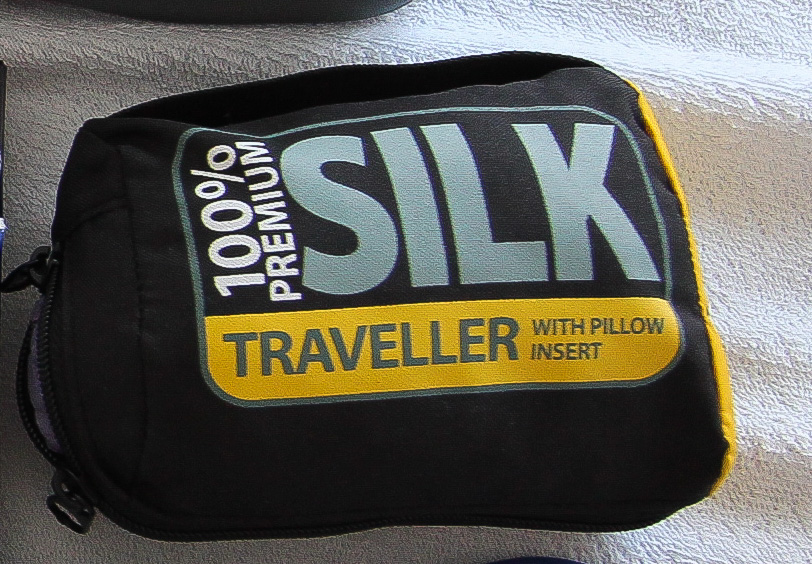
Sleeping bag liner

Sleeping bag liners are lightweight cloth sacks usually fitted inside sleeping bags to provide extra comfort, insulation, and help keep the sleeping bag clean.

A thin liner may feel softer against the sleeper's skin, add 5 °F warmth to the bag (not pad), and be easily washed after use (unlike the thicker sleeping bag). A thick, fleece-like liner can increase warmth by 10-15 °F. Liners also allow a sleeper to use the liner alone, without the bag in hot conditions. Optionally, bug-repellents, pockets, and a pillow holder can be added to liners.

A vapor barrier liner (VBL) is special type of liner that blocks the sleeper's moisture from reaching the bag, thus stopping evaporative heat loss. Usually a sleeping bag liner is used inside a VBL.

Sleeping bag liners are issued as basic kit by various militaries including the US and British armed forces.

== Fabrics ==
Liners are made of silk, cotton, nylon and polyester among others;

Silk liners
light, soft and strong and retain much thermal insulation even when wet
Cotton
heavier and bulkier than silk and absorbs water
Synthetic [mix]
usually light, strong, and do not absorb water

== See also ==
- Bivouac sack – a small, lightweight, waterproof alternative to larger tent-like shelters
- Mosquito net – a type of meshed curtain that is draped over a sleeping area, to offer protection against bites and stings from pest insects, and thus against the diseases they may carry
