= Expanded polyethylene =

Foams made with polyethylene

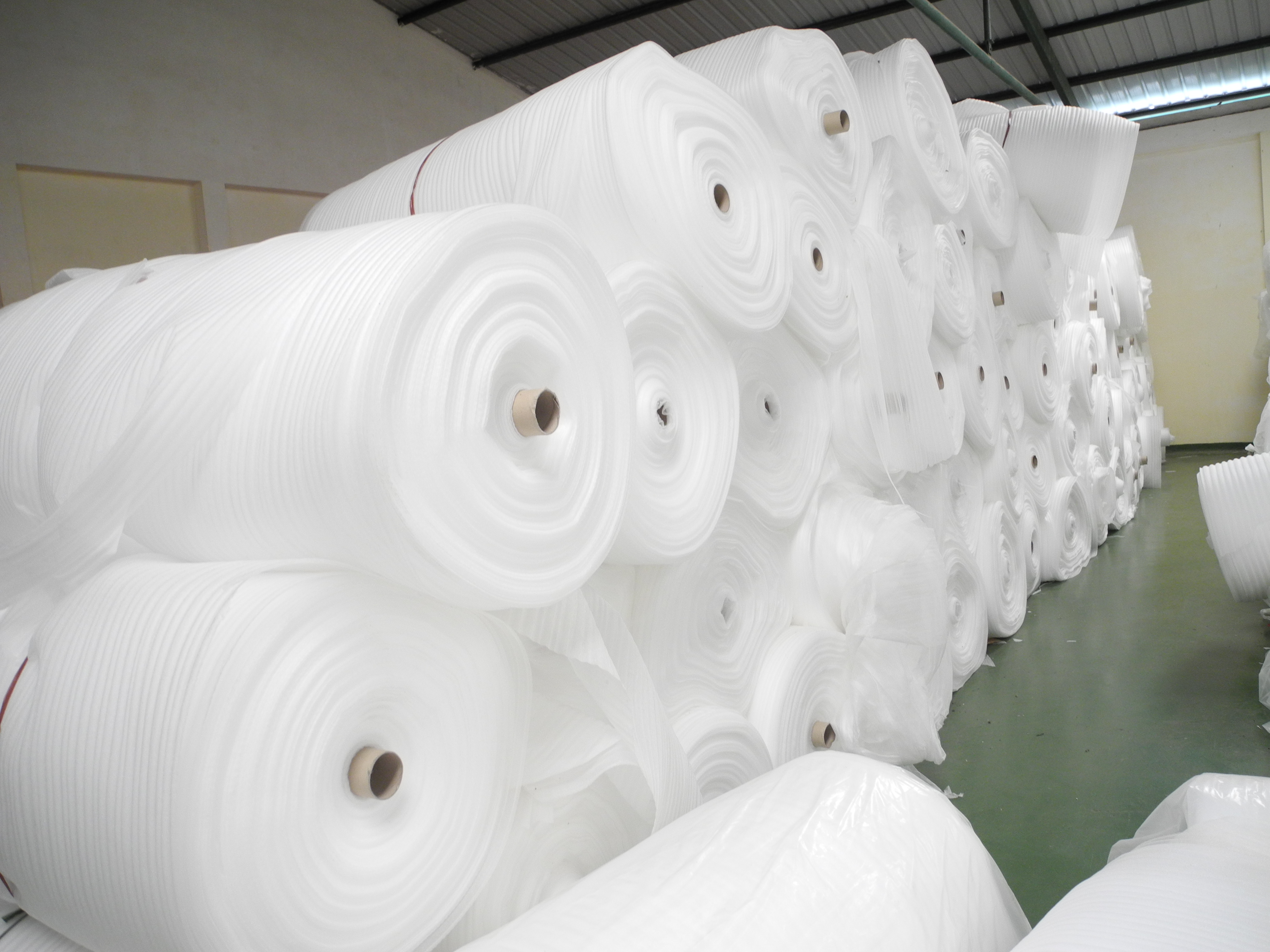
Polyethylene foam

Expanded polyethylene (EPE foam) refers to foams made from polyethylene. Typically it is made from expanded pellets ('EPE bead') made with use of a blowing agent, followed by expansion into a mold in a steam chest - the process is similar to that used to make expanded polystyrene foam.

== Properties ==
EPE foams are low density, semi-rigid, closed cell foam that are generally somewhere in stiffness/compliance between Expanded polystyrene and Polyurethane. Production of EPE foams is similar to that of expanded polystyrene, but starting with PE beads. Typical densities are 29 to 120 kg/m^{3} (49 to 202 lb/cu yd) with the lower figure being common. Densities as low as 14 kg/m^{3} (24 lb/cu yd) can be produced.

Base polymer for EPE foams range from Low-density polyethylene (LDPE) to High-density polyethylene (HDPE).

=== Co-polymers ===
Expanded polyethylene copolymers (EPC) are also known - such as 50:50 (weight) materials with polystyrene. Though other properties are intermediate between the two bases, toughness for the copolymer exceeds either, with good tensile and puncture resistance. It is particularly applicable for re-usable products.

== Production ==
EPE foams were first manufactured in the 1970s.

Production of the PE beads is usually by extrusion, followed by chopping, producing a 'pellet'. Autoclave expansion is the most common route the bead foam. Butane or pentane is often used as a blowing agent (before 1992 CFCs may have been used). Depending on the specific process uses the beads may be cross-linked either by electron beam irradiation (see Electron beam processing), or by the addition of a chemical agent such as dicumyl peroxide.

An alternate route (JSP Process) to the beads uses carbon dioxide as a blowing agent which is impregnated into the pellets in an autoclave at a temperature close to the plastic's crystalline melting point. The pellets are foamed by "flashing" into the (lower pressure) atmosphere to expand.

Finally molding is done by steam chest compression molding; usually the low pressure variant of the process is used, though the high pressure variant may be used for HDPE based EPE foams.

== Uses ==
Polyethylene bead foams (including) EPE can be used to replace both polystyrene foam, and both rigid and flexible polyurethane. Uses include cushioning applications, and impact absorption applications including packaging.

Consumption of polyethylene for PE foam was estimated at 114 × 10^{6} kg in 2001. The majority was used for non-crosslinked foams, but crosslinked PE foams represented a significant (~ one third) fraction of demand. Use in protective packaging represented the largest use sector for such foams.

Gore-Tex uses EPE for a waterproof, windproof and breathable fabric for winter clothing.

Expanded polyethylene industry

- Furukawa Electric, TORAYPEF, Sekisui Chemical in Japan
- Pacific Industry Co., Ltd in Korea
- Sealed air, Poly air in USA

== See also ==
- Waterproof fabric
