= Thinsulate =

Brand of thermal insulation used in clothing

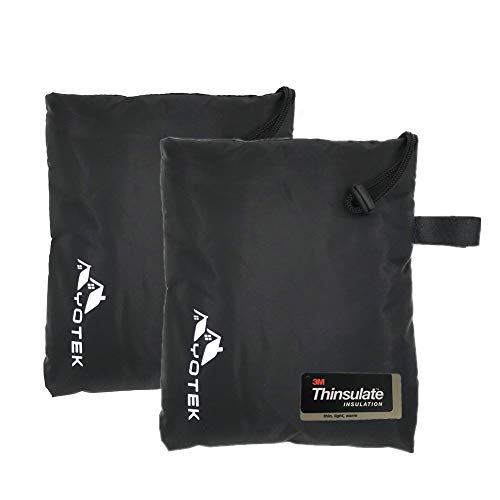
- Outdoor faucet cover socks made from Thinsulate
- Product type: Synthetic fiber
- Current owner: 3M
- Produced by: 3M
- Country: USA
- Introduced: 1979

Thinsulate is a brand of synthetic fiber thermal insulation used in winter clothing. The word is a portmanteau of the words thin and insulate, and is trademarked by 3M. The material is made by the 3M Corporation and was first sold in 1979. It was originally marketed as an inexpensive alternative to down; at the time, 3M claimed it was twice as warm as an equivalent amount of any natural material.

Originally designed for clothing, it later became popular as an acoustic damping material. In 1997, 3M generated US$150 million in annual revenue from the product. Its development originated from other microfibre products made by 3M. It has been used in US army clothing since the mid-1980s.

== Description ==
Thinsulate fibers are about 15 micrometres (0.00059 in) in diameter, which is thinner than the polyester fibers normally used in insulation for clothing such as gloves or winter jackets. Advertising material suggests that Thinsulate is more effective due to the increased density of fibers with decreased size of fibers compared with more traditional insulation. Like most insulation materials, the gaps between fibers not only reduce heat flow, but also allow moisture to escape. It retains its insulating properties when wet.

The thermal resistance R-value provided by Thinsulate products varies by the specific thickness and construction of the fabric. Values (US units) range from 1.6 for 80-gram fabric to 2.9 for 200-gram fabric. Thinsulate is considered "the warmest thin apparel insulation" available. In fact, when equal thicknesses are compared, it provides about 1½ times the warmth of down and about twice the warmth of other high-loft insulation materials.

Material safety data sheets from the manufacturer show that different varieties of Thinsulate are made from different mixtures of polymers, but most are primarily polyethylene terephthalate or a mixture of polyethylene terephthalate and polypropylene. Other materials in some include polyethylene terephthalate-polyethylene isophthalate copolymer and acrylic.

Thinsulate is now used in the fabric roof of the convertible automobile, the Porsche Boxster. The extra layer not only reduces heat loss but has also reduced noise levels inside the car by 3 decibels. It is also used in the roof of the Jaguar F-Type sports car. It features in the upholstery of Saturn sedans, Ford F-150 pickups, Buick Park Avenues, and F-16 fighters.

It is used in a wide variety of clothing products, such as footwear, gloves, hats, and coats. It became popular in outerwear jackets as early as 1985. The fibers are thinner in diameter than polyester fibres, so the material is used as a waterproof synthetic alternative to down.

In 2015 Thinsulate was named a recipient of an ISPO Award as a Top 10 Insulation.

== See also ==
- PrimaLoft
