= Aglet =

Sheath on the end of a shoelace or cord

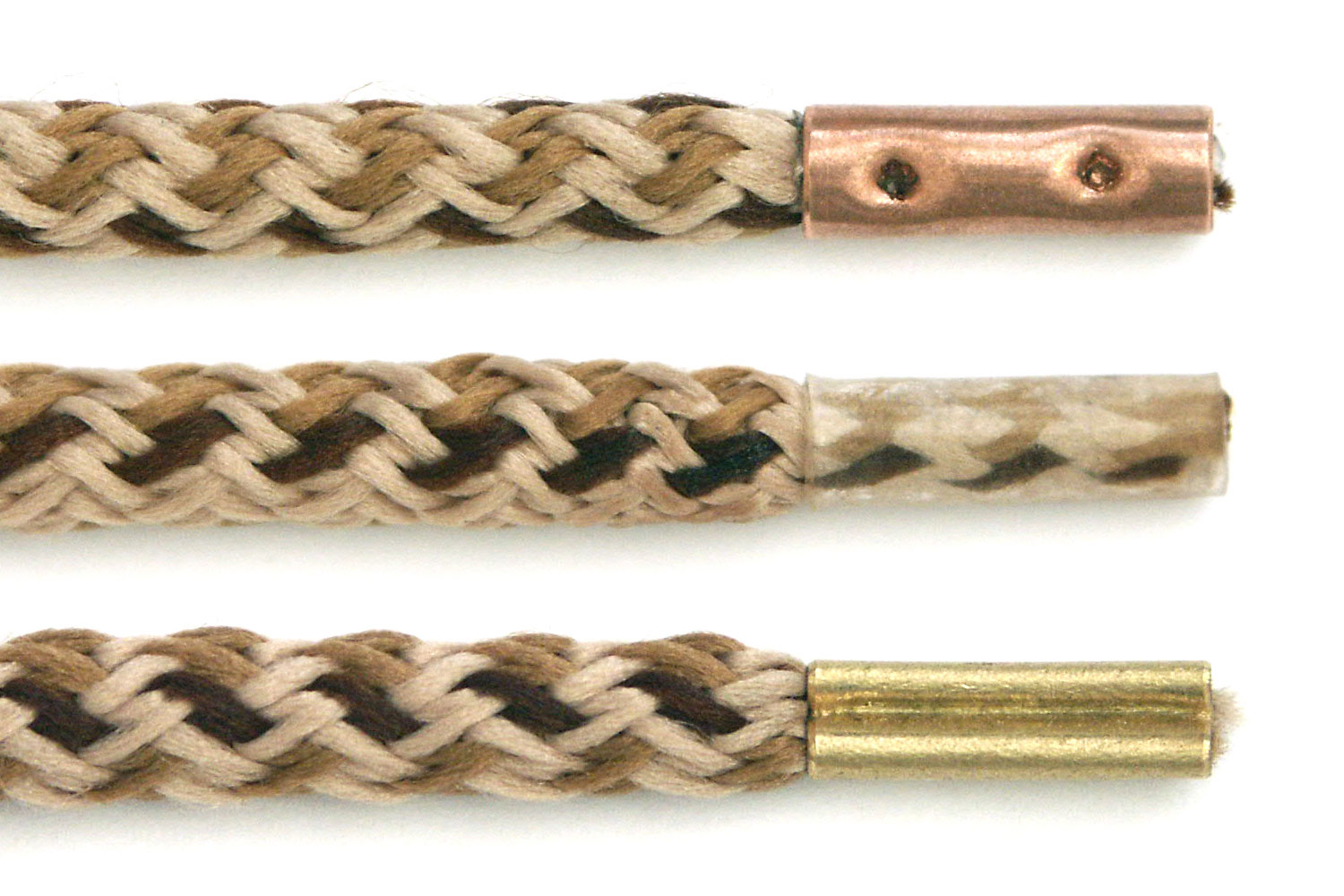
Three different types of aglets: double-punched copper, plastic sheath, and inward fold brass

An aglet (/ˈæɡlət/ AG-lət) or aiglet is a small sheath, often made of plastic or metal, attached at each end of a shoelace, a cord, or a drawstring. An aglet keeps the fibers of the lace or cord from unraveling; its firmness and narrow profile make it easier to hold and easier to feed through eyelets, lugs, or other lacing guides.

== Etymology ==
The word aglet and its variant aiglet come from the Middle French and Old French word aguillette, the diminutive of aguille, meaning "needle, pin", which in turn comes from the Late Latin acucula ("ornamental pin, pine needle"), diminutive of acus, the Latin word for a needle or pin.

== History ==
Aglets were originally made of metal, glass, or stone, and many were very ornamental. Wealthy people in the Roman era would have their aglets made out of precious metals such as brass or silver.

Before the invention of buttons, they were used on the ends of the ribbons used to fasten clothing together. Sometimes they were formed into small figures. Shakespeare calls this type of figure an "aglet baby" in The Taming of the Shrew.

Many sources credit the history of the aglet's evolution as being popularized by English inventor Harvey Kennedy. He is said to have earned $2.5 million off the modern shoelace in the 1790s.

Today, the clear plastic aglets on the end of shoelaces are placed by special machines. The machines wrap plastic tape around the end of new shoelaces and use heat or chemicals to melt the plastic onto the shoelace and bond the plastic to itself.

== Variety ==
There is a subtle distinction between aglets, which are generally functional, and aiguillettes, which are generally decorative. Aiguillettes usually appear at the end of decorative cords, such as bolo ties and the cords on military dress uniforms.

Shoe companies often produce their own shoelaces, for which they manufacture aglets. Many companies prefer to add metal sheaths over plastic aglets for better durability. Some may also add logos or pictures.

== See also ==
- Ferrule
- Whipping knot
