= Cord lock =

Fastening system

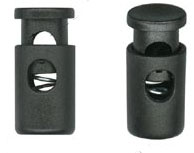
Barrel-type flat-top cord lock

A plastic cord lock (also known as cord fastener, plastic stopper, spring clasp or cord toggle) attaches to drawstrings and tightens without the use of knots. Cord locks allow mountaineers to fasten clothing and camping equipment quickly in cold conditions when the fingers are encased in heavy gloves. They consist generally of three parts: a barrel, a toggle (plunger), and a spring. Squeezed together, tension is released and the cord lock can move freely up and down the cords. Released, the tension is engaged and the cord lock stays in place. They come in many sizes and shapes to suit any purpose, including plastic cord lock, mini size cord lock, no spring cord lock, with spring cord lock, with rim cord lock.

Cord fasteners are used in many different applications to retain one or more cord segments or drawstrings in a tightened condition and to release such cord segments when desired. For example, cord locks are used in connection with garments that include drawstrings, such as hooded jackets and sweatshirts. Such fasteners are also used on various types of bags such as laundry bags and other storage bags that utilize cords to temporarily close an open end. They are also used in window blinds. They vary in size depending on the particular application, from 1–3 inches (25–76 mm) long.

One of many variations of a cord lock was invented by Mark J. Krauss in 1986.
