= Outdoor Writers and Photographers Guild =

Group for writers specialising in the outdoors

The Outdoor Writers and Photographers Guild was established in 1980 as the Outdoor Writers Guild - a professional group for writers specialising in the outdoors. In 2006 the Guild changed its name to Outdoor Writers and Photographers Guild to recognise that members had professional skills in other areas to writing, with an informal strapline ‘Words and Pictures from the Outdoors’. Today’s membership includes writers, journalists, photographers, illustrators, broadcasters, film-makers, artists, web designers, publishers and editors, but all with the common bond of a passionate interest in the outdoors.

Most members are based in the UK although membership extends internationally. It has around 100 members and is run by a committee of members. The current chair is the author and photographer Josephine Collingwood.

Each year, the Guild hosts an AGM and Awards weekend, at various locations across the UK and Channel Islands. Previous destinations have included Isle of Wight, Snowdonia, Jersey, Shropshire and Northumberland. The weekend is an opportunity for members to come together for learning workshops, the awards ceremony, the Annual General Meeting as well as social events.

== Awards ==
The Guild annually presents Awards for Excellence, which are open to members only, as well as an award for technical innovation in the outdoors.

Awards which members can enter include Outdoor Article/Feature, Technical Article/Feature, Guidebook, Photography, Outdoor Book.

Recent winners can be found on the OWPG website.

=== Golden Eagle Award ===
The Golden Eagle Award, an original watercolour painting by Guild member, David Bellamy, was presented to a person who has rendered distinguished or meritorious service to the outdoors generally. It ran from 1995 to 2023. Recipients were:

1995: Ken Wilson

1996: Walt Unsworth
1997: Dr Rennie McOwan
1998: Alan Mattingly
1999: Chris Brasher CBE
2000: Irvine Butterfield
2001: Tom Weir
2002: John Cleare
2003: Alan Blackshaw and Cedric Robinson MBE
2004: Sir David Attenborough
2005: Doug Scott CBE
2006: Kate Ashbrook and Robin and Sue Harvey
2007: W. R. 'Bill' Mitchell MBE
2008: Sir Chris Bonington CBE
2009: Marion Shoard
2010: Jonathan Williams
2011: Bill Bryson
2012: Dr Adam Watson
2013: No award
2014: John Grimshaw
2015–16: no award
2017: Richard Fox
2018: Chris Packham
2019-21: Not awarded
2022: Nick Owen MBE

2023: Rhiane Fatinikun MBE

=== OWPG Award for Technical Innovation (and its predecessors, the Crystal Award and the Derryck Draper Award) ===
1999: Perseverance Mills (Pertex)
2000: Brasher Boot Company
2001: Nextec (Encapsulated Fabrics)
2002: GoLite
2003: Not awarded
2004: Lyon Equipment

2006: Steripen
2007: Satmap Active 10 GPS
2008: Teko socks system
2009: Therm-a-Rest NeoAir mattress by Cascade Designs
2010: Laser Photon tent by TerraNova
2011: Neoshell Fabric by Polartec
2012: Biolite Campstove
2013: Brunton Hydrogen Reactor
2014: Primaloft Down Blend Insulation
2015: Osprey’s suspended AntiGravity™ backsystem
2016: Pertex CS10 Technology fabric
2017: Outdoor Design Logistics X-tex breathable fabric for single skin tents
2018: Not awarded
2019: Not awarded
2020: Not awarded
2021: PrimaLoft® P.U.R.E.™ (Produced Using Reduced Emissions)

2022: Garmin inReach Mini2

2023: Built to Send X3 Alpine

2024: BAM

=== Golden Boot Award ===
The Golden Boot Award was presented annually to a person or company exhibiting at the Camping and Outdoor Leisure Association (COLA) Show in Harrogate, who Guild members felt had made an outstanding contribution to the outdoors.
Award Winners
1982: Phoenix Mountaineering
1983: Berghaus
1984: Carrington Performance Fabrics
1985: Robert Saunders
1986: Buffalo
1987: Conway Trailers Ltd
1988: Nick Brown (Nikwax)
1989: Captain Harrison
1990: Chris Brasher (Brasher Boot Company)
1991: Mike Parsons (Karrimor)
1992: Gordon Conyers
1993: Gordon Davison/Peter Lockey
1994: Ben Lyon
1995:Harvey Maps
1996: Nick Brown (Páramo)
1997: Bill Wilkins
1998: Not awarded

=== Lifetime Achievement Award ===
The Guild presents a Lifetime Achievement Award "on an occasional basis to one of our own members for outstanding work in our professional field of outdoor writing, photography, or related fields".

As of 2021 it has been awarded twice:

2014: Kev Reynolds
2015: Hamish Brown

=== Associate Members ===
The OWPG is proud to work with various Award Sponsors/Associate Members who support the Guild and are for the benefit of users, suppliers, the environment, OWPG members and the outdoors community generally. Currently, the OWPG closely works with Cicerone Press, Conway Publishing, Cordee, and Crimson/Pathfinder Guides.
