= Topophilia =

Special love for peculiar places

Topophilia (From Greek topos "place" and -philia, "love of") is a strong sense of place, which often becomes mixed with the sense of cultural identity among certain people and a love of certain aspects of such a place.

== History of the term ==
Alan Watts's autobiography, In My Own Way (1972), starts with the sentence: "Topophilia is a word invented by the British poet John Betjeman for a special love for peculiar places." But it was W. H. Auden who used the term in his 1948 introduction to John Betjeman's poetry book Slick but Not Streamlined, stressing that the term "has little in common with nature love" but depended upon a landscape infused with a sense of history. The term later appeared in the French philosopher Gaston Bachelard's highly influential The Poetics of Space (1958). Yi-Fu Tuan employed the term for the feeling-link between person and place as part of his development of a humanistic geography. James W. Gibson, in his book A Reenchanted World (2009) also argues that topophilia or "love of place" is a biologically based, close cultural connection to place. Gibson says that such connections mostly have been destroyed in modernity but argues that "more and more people are trying to reinvent them."

== In relation to local sports ==
Sports geographer John Bale has extensively applied Tuan's concept of topophilia to the study of sports stadiums, arguing that they are not merely physical structures but "places" defined by emotional attachment and memory.

Historian Mike Cronin, drawing on Bale's work, notes that stadiums generate topophilia through specific metaphors:

1. Sacred Space: Sites of ritual and intensity, sometimes amplified by tragedy (e.g., the Hillsborough disaster).
2. Scenic Place: The aesthetic appeal of the stadium and its surroundings (e.g., the Gateway Arch visible from Busch Stadium).
3. Home: A site of belonging and psychological comfort for fans and teams.
4. Tourist Attraction: A destination for "pilgrimage" even when no match is being played (e.g., tours of the Melbourne Cricket Ground).
5. Local Symbol: A vessel for civic pride and patriotism.

== Use in the media ==
Topophilia, a feature-length documentary from 2015 by artist Peter Bo Rappmund that follows the Trans-Alaska Pipeline.

== Negative side ==
Topophilia can also have a negative side, serving as a motive force behind nationalism and social exclusion, and even extending sometimes to the nazist celebration of Blood and Soil.

== See also ==
- Edgelands
- Gary Snyder
- Heimat
- Hortus conclusus
- Spirit of place
- Genius loci
- Topophobia
