= Edgelands =

Liminal spaces at the edges of populated areas

Edgelands is a term for the transitional, liminal zone of space created between rural and urban areas as formed by urbanisation. These spaces often contain nature alongside cities, towns, roads and unsightly but necessary buildings, such as power substations or depots, at the edge of cities.

== History ==
The concept of edgelands in human geography was introduced by Marion Shoard in 2002, to cover the disorganised but often fertile hinterland between planned town and over-managed countryside. However, a century and a half earlier, Victor Hugo had already highlighted the existence of what he called "bastard countryside ... ugly but bizarre, made up of two different natures, which surrounds certain great cities"; while Richard Jeffries similarly explored the London edgeland in Nature near London (1883).

== See also ==
- Geocriticism
- Human geography
- Thirdspace
- Topophilia
- W. G. Sebald
