= Marion Shoard =

British writer and campaigner (born 1949)

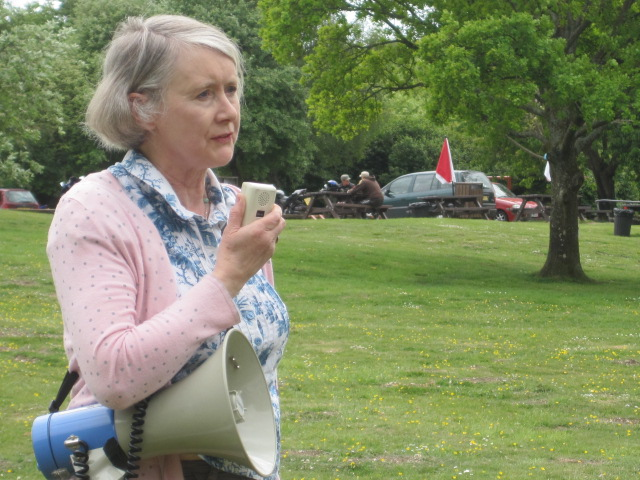
- Shoard speaking at a rally in Sussex, 2011
- Born: 6 April 1949 (age 77); Redruth, Cornwall
- Education: St Hilda's College, Oxford
- Occupations: Writer, campaigner
- Website: marionshoard.co.uk

Marion Shoard (born 6 April 1949) is a British writer and campaigner. She is best known for her work concerning access to the countryside. In 2002 she became the first person to give a name to the "edgelands" between town and country. In 2004, she largely switched focus to write and campaign about older people's issues.

She is the author of five books. Her 2000 book, A Right to Roam, won the Outdoor Writers and Photographers Guild's Book of the Year award and was shortlisted for the George Orwell prize. Her 2003 essay, Edgelands, also won their Award of Excellence. In 2006, the Environment Agency named her amongst the top 100 green campaigners of all time. In 2009, she received the Outdoor Writers and Photographers Guild Golden Eagle lifetime achievement award.

In 2022, Caroline Lucas, the leader of the Green Party, drew upon Shoard's work when opening the debate in the House of Commons to the Countryside and Rights of Way Act 2000 (Amendment) Bill, calling her a "giant of the environment movement".

== Life and career ==
Shoard was born in Redruth, Cornwall but spent most of her childhood in Ramsgate, Kent. She was educated at Clarendon House Grammar School in Ramsgate and St Hilda's College, Oxford, where she read zoology, before studying town and country planning at Kingston-upon-Thames Polytechnic (now Kingston University).

She worked for four years at the Council for the Protection of Rural England before writing her first book, The Theft of the Countryside (1980). The book triggered debate over the conflict between modern industrial agriculture and the conservation of the UK's countryside. In 1987 Shoard published This Land is Our Land, which examined the history of the relationship between landowners and the landless and proposed it be altered. The same year Shoard presented a documentary on the same subject, Power in the Land.

Shoard continued campaigning, teaching planning at the University of Reading, University College London and Anglia Ruskin University and writing articles for newspapers and magazines. An updated edition of This Land is Our Land was published in 1997.

In 1999 Shoard published A Right to Roam, which explored how a general right of access to the UK's countryside might work. In 2002, her essay on edgelands was the first to name and set forward the characteristics of an emerging landscape on the urban fringe.

After Shoard's mother fell ill in the 1990s, she wrote a guidebook, A Survival Guide to Later Life, offering advice to older people and their carers. A new book, How to Handle Later Life, was published on 1 September 2017.

== Published books ==
=== The Theft of the Countryside ===
Shoard's first book was an attempt to explain how farming was transforming the countryside by chronicling the loss of landscape features and wildlife diversity. It explores the impact of subsidies on such change and food over-production. Shoard proposes a variety of planning control extensions, the designation of new national parks and measures to repair damaged landscapes.

The Theft of the Countryside led to renewed focus on whether steps should be taken to protect the countryside against industrial agriculture.

=== This Land is Our Land ===
First published in 1987, followed by an updated edition in 1997 with a foreword by George Monbiot, Shoard's second book focuses on land ownership and the legacy of much of the UK's land having been in the possession of a relatively small number of people for a long time. It attempts to analyse the scope of landowners' power over the social structure of the countryside and beyond, contrasting the situation with that abroad. Shoard proposes a general right of access and a form of green land taxation in Britain.

The book, which was made into a Channel 4 documentary, is regarded as a key text on the subject.

=== A Right to Roam ===
Published in 1999, Shoard's third book explores the history of access to the countryside in the UK and abroad. It discusses the possible impact and drawbacks of the partial right later enacted in the Countryside and Rights of Way Act 2000 passed by the Labour government under Tony Blair. A Right to Roam was shortlisted for the Orwell Prize and won the Outdoor Writers and Photographers Guild's book of the year award. Nine years later Shoard also won that body's lifetime achievement award.

=== A Survival Guide to Later Life ===
In 2004, Shoard wrote a guidebook for older people and their relatives. It was prompted by Shoard's experience struggling to find independent and in-depth advice after her own mother fell ill.

=== How to Handle Later Life ===
In 2017, Shoard published a much-expanded, 1,160-page second book about older people's issues. A review in the Evening Standard described it as "unique, essential and considerate", while another in the Psychology of Older People called it "the best collection of sound advice that I have come across". The Nursing Times said it was "extremely well written, informative, well thought through" and that "everyone should read this book" while Third Age Matters, the University of the Third Age newsletter, said, "There should be a copy in every library, council office, doctor’s practice, MP’s surgery, Citizens Advice Bureau, Age UK office, if not in every household". Meanwhile The Methodist Recorder said, “This book will be of great value to middle-aged and elderly individuals as well as to family carers of older relatives. Reliable and comprehensive ... It should be found in every public library.”

== Bibliography ==
- The Theft of the Countryside (1981, Maurice Temple Smith) ISBN 0-85117-200-8
- This Land is Our Land (1987, Collins) ISBN 0-586-08473-8
- A Right to Roam (1999, Oxford University Press) ISBN 0-19-288016-0
- A Survival Guide to Later Life (2004, Constable & Robinson) ISBN 1-84119-372-0
- How to Handle Later Life (May 2017, Amaranth) ISBN 978-0956761521

== Published articles and essays ==
In the 1980s, Shoard wrote regular columns in Environment Now magazine and the Today newspaper as well as frequently for The Times, The Guardian and History Today.

=== Landscape protection ===
An early essay by Shoard suggested that moor and upland enthusiasts had a disproportionate amount of leverage over landscape policy. In The Theft of the Countryside and articles in The Times, Shoard argued lowland landscape required greater protection, in part through national parks. She also suggested they be created in Scotland and Northern Ireland, which then had no national parks.

Shoard has also argued landscapes are harder to protect than buildings, discussed the way in which children use the countryside, and the impact of place on the work of poets such as Robert Frost and Dylan Thomas.

In 2002, Shoard wrote an essay entitled "Edgelands", which was the first work to identify a landscape Shoard calls "a netherworld neither urban or rural … the hotchpotch collection of superstores, sewage works, golf courses and surprisingly wildlife-rich roughlands which sit between town and country in the urban fringe". The essay identifies the characteristics of the edgelands, discusses the threats that face them and argues they should be greater celebrated. The essay won the Outdoor Writers and Photographers Guild's Award of Excellence for the best one-off feature in 2003 and its principles have been adopted by nature writers such as Robert Macfarlane and in academia. In 2004, Shoard co-authored a report on the urban fringe for the Countryside Agency.

In an essay in 1976 Shoard argued that recreation ought to play a greater role in promoting countryside conservation. An essay by Shoard in 1998 questioned the assumptions underlying the debate about greater public access. At the time of the Countryside and Rights of Way Act 2000, Shoard wrote extensively about the ideology of the proposed legislation and its possible limitations.

This Land is Our Land charts the struggles over land rights in Britain and abroad, explores the ways in which land owners currently wield power, and the effectiveness of measures which seek to protect the public interest in land such as common land, public footpaths and conservation designations. Shoard puts forward proposals for a new land tax modelled on that advocated by the American radical Henry George, as well as a general right of access to the countryside which would overturn the present law of trespass.

=== Age issues ===
Shoard’s experience with her mother and with many other people whom she has helped over the years has convinced her that the lives of older people could be immeasurably enriched were they to acquaint themselves with information about their changing physiological and psychological needs and how to make the most of the services and legal rights available to older people. In 2004 Constable and Robinson published her 600-page A Survival Guide to Later Life, which was largely replaced in 2017 by her 1000-page How to Handle Later Life, published by Amaranth Books.

Shoard writes and speaks about older people’s issues, gives advice to individuals and their families and campaigns for change.

In 2005, Shoard claimed, "Government at both national and local levels is one of the worst perpetrators of age discrimination", with particular reference to the reduction by two-thirds in the number of NHS beds for elderly people with long-term disabling conditions over the last quarter of the 20th century. This had left those who would have received NHS care having to pay the considerable cost in nursing homes, many of which provide a low standard of care. In 2005, Shoard also proposed a new charter for carers of older and disabled people, pointing out that, "The decision to become a carer can transform a person's life just as dramatically if not more so than becoming a parent".

Shoard has argued against a change in legislation which would sanction assisted suicide, writing that:

Institutionalising the killing of elderly people would diminish the sanctity of life in our society as a whole. In particular, it would further undermine the position of elderly people who need care, whether or not their lives are threatened. What these citizens need is a thorough-going programme of help and support and a radical improvement in their status in society, not a licence to be killed.

Shoard’s mother spent short periods in three care homes in the late 1990s and the treatment of older and disabled people in these establishments has been an enduring interest of hers ever since. Since the launch of How to Handle Later Life at Tunbridge Wells Waterstones in 2017, she has been calling for care home residents to be given a right of access to the outdoors.

During the Covid-19 pandemic in 2020, she urged that people living in care homes should enjoy much greater contact with people and places outside homes, where this can be done safely, than care home managers were permitting on the ground. Shoard served for several years as a trustee of the voluntary group the Relatives and Residents Association, which seeks to help older and disabled people living in care homes and their families.

In 2019 Shoard joined the executive committee of the ecumenical organisation Christians on Ageing and has put forward suggestions for ways in which faith groups could provide better and more informed support to older people in articles in Reform, The Church of England Newspaper and the journal of Christians on Ageing, plus.

Shoard was involved in the Sutton branch, London Area Forum and National Advisory Council of the Alzheimer's Society, and sits on the Society's Quality Research in Dementia Forum, which evaluates applications for research project funding. Shoard has argued that a major shift in perceptions of the disease is needed.

== Recent campaigns ==
Shoard fought to prevent building on May Hill in Gloucestershire and the erection of a grid of polytunnels over an area of countryside frequented by the Dymock poets. She led campaigns in Dorking, Surrey, to stop Mole Valley district council reducing a day centre and Strood in Kent to stop Medway council moving Strood public library and selling off the site for housing.

== See also ==
- Edgelands
- Freedom to roam
- Elderly care
