= Kev Reynolds =

English outdoor writer (1943–2021)

Kev Reynolds (7 December 1943 – 10 December 2021) was an English outdoor writer, known for his guidebooks for climbing and walking in the Pyrenees, the Alps, the Himalayas and southern England.

== Personal life ==
Reynolds was born on 7 December 1943 at Ingatestone in Essex. He worked in local government until 1967, when he married Min and they moved to St. Moritz, where they worked in a hostel. They returned to England and became wardens of Crockham Hill YHA youth hostel. They later lived in Edenbridge in Kent.

His first trip abroad was to the Atlas Mountains of Morocco in 1965, travelling by truck with a group of friends. He visited the Pyrenees and the Alps while writing guidebooks to those areas in the 1970s and 1980s, and in 1989 made the first of almost 20 trips to Nepal and the adjacent areas of India. He declared that Manaslu in the Himalayas was "the most beautiful walk in the world".

Kev Reynolds died on 10 December 2021, aged 78, having suffered from tuberculosis, which restricted his life during the COVID-19 pandemic. He was survived by his wife Min, two children and two grandchildren.

== Writing ==
Reynolds wrote more than 50 books on climbing and walking, on areas including the Pyrenees, the Alps, the Himalayas, Nepal, and southern England.

His first published book was Walks and Climbs in the Pyrenees in 1978: its seventh edition was published in 2019. His Trekking the Tour of Mont Blanc appeared in its 5th edition in 2020. Cameron McNeish described his Walking in the Alps as "probably the most important guide to walking abroad that has been published in Britain. It is simply stunning...". As well as numerous mountain guides he wrote guides to the North Downs Way, South Downs Way and Cotswold Way. In 2013 he published A Walk in the Clouds, a collection of 75 autobiographical stories, and in 2019 he edited Fifty Years of Adventure, a celebration of 50 years of his main publisher the Cicerone Press.

== Recognition ==
Reynolds was one of the first honorary members of the British Association of European Mountain Leaders, later the British Association of International Mountain Leaders and also an honorary member of the Outdoor Writers and Photographers Guild, which in 2014 recognised him with its Lifetime Achievement Award.

== Selected publications ==
- Reynolds, Kev (2020). Trekking the tour of Mont Blanc : complete two-way hiking guidebook and map booklet (Fifth ed.). Kendal. ISBN 9781786310620.
- Reynolds, Kev (2019). Walks and climbs in the Pyrenees : walks, climbs and multi-day treks (Seventh ed.). Kendal, Cumbria: Cicerone. ISBN 9781786310538. First edition: 1978, ISBN 9780902363212
- Reynolds, Kev, ed. (2018). Fifty Years of Adventure. Cicerone Press. ISBN 9781786310309. (Celebrating fifty years of the Cicerone Press)
- Reynolds, Kev (2017). The South Downs Way : Winchester to Eastbourne, described in both directions (4th ed.). Milnthorpe. ISBN 9781852849405.
- Reynolds, Kev (2013). A Walk in the Clouds: Fifty Years among the Mountains. Cicerone Press. ISBN 978-1-85284-726-5. (75 autobiographical stories)
- Reynolds, Kev (2005). Walking in the Alps (2nd ed.). [Milnthorpe]: Cicerone. ISBN 9781852844769.
