= Madonna on a Crescent Moon in Hortus Conclusus =

1450s painting

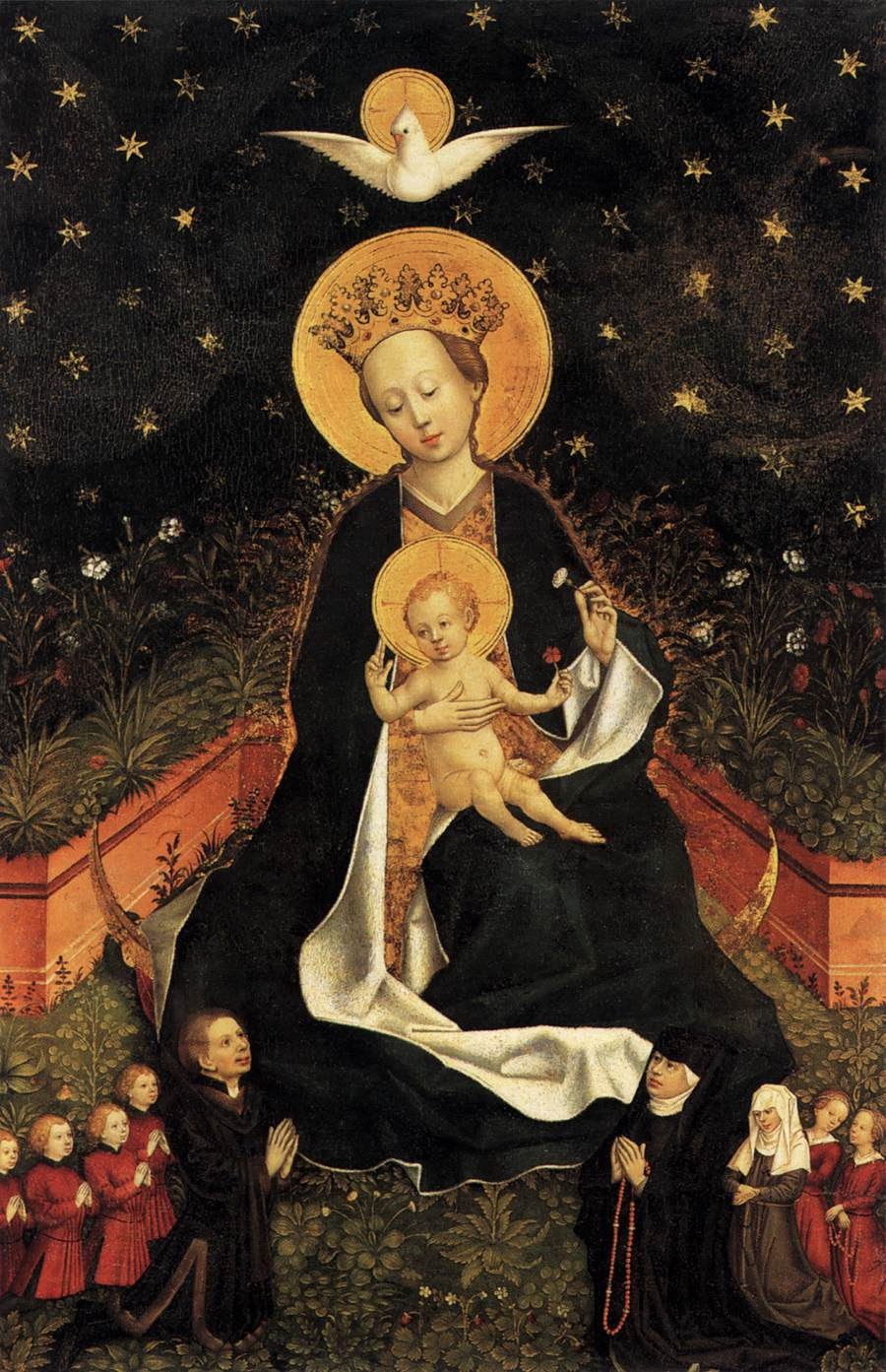
- Artist: Unknown (The Master of 1456)
- Year: 1450s
- Dimensions: 95 cm × 62 cm (37 in × 24 in)
- Location: Gemäldegalerie; Berlin

The Madonna on a Crescent Moon in Hortus Conclusus is a 1450s painting by an unknown artist referred to as the “Master of 1456”. It is held by the Gemäldegalerie in Berlin.

Hortus conclusus is Latin for "enclosed garden", a motif of biblical origin where the Virgin Mary herself is represented as a garden.
