= Hortus conclusus =

Enclosed garden; attribute of the Virgin Mary

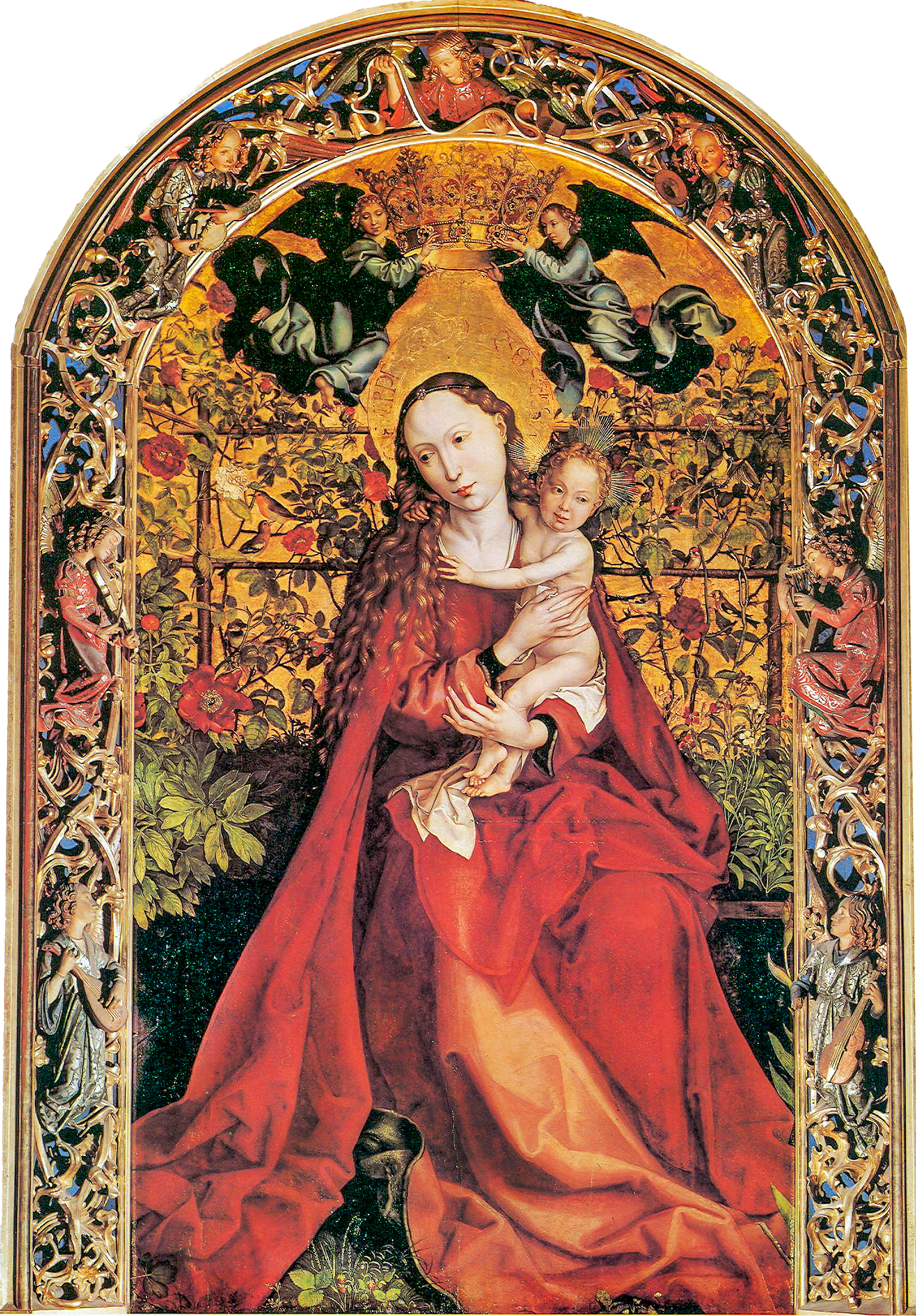
Martin Schongauer, Madonna of the Rose Bower, 1473

Hortus conclusus is a Latin term, meaning literally "enclosed garden". Both words in hortus conclusus refer linguistically to enclosure. It describes a type of garden that was enclosed as a practical concern, a major theme in the history of gardening, as walled gardens used to be more commonplace. The garden room is a similar feature, usually less fully enclosed.

Having roots in the Song of Songs in the Hebrew scriptures, the term hortus conclusus has importantly been applied as an emblematic attribute and a title of the Virgin Mary in Medieval and Renaissance poetry and art, first appearing in paintings and manuscript illuminations about 1330.

== The Virgin Mary as hortus conclusus ==
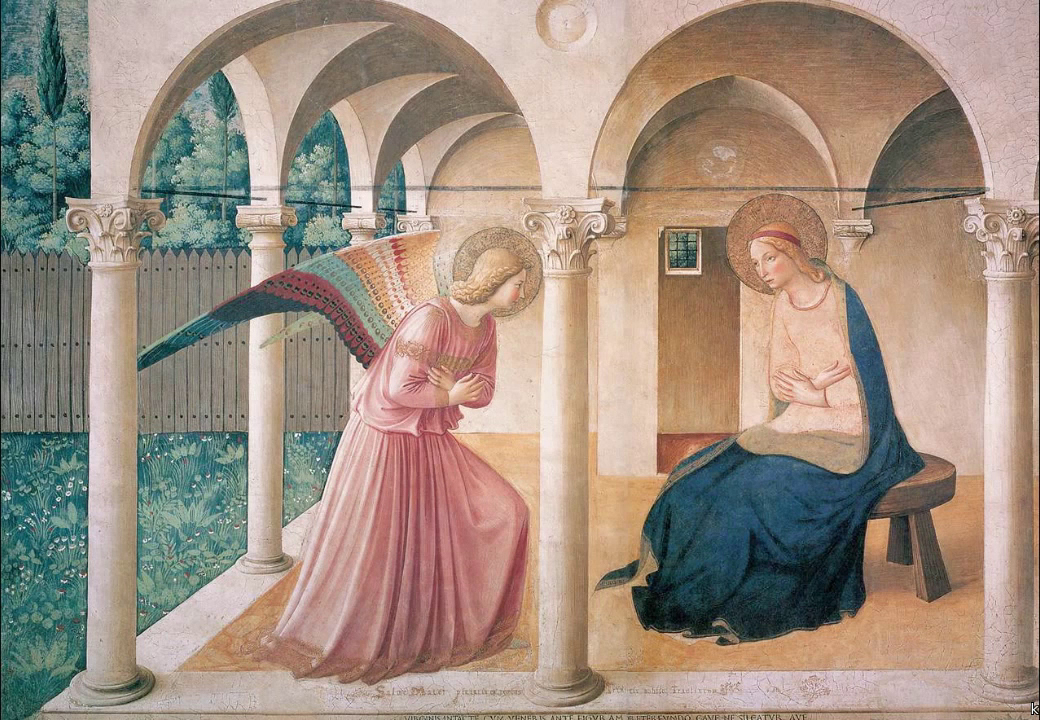
The Annunciation - Convent of San Marco, Florence

The term hortus conclusus is derived from the Vulgate Bible's Canticle of Canticles (also called the Song of Songs or Song of Solomon) 4:12, in Latin: "Hortus conclusus soror mea, sponsa, hortus conclusus, fons signatus" ("A garden enclosed is my sister, my spouse; a garden enclosed, a fountain sealed up.") This provided the shared linguistic culture of Christendom, expressed in homilies expounding the Song of Songs as allegory where the image of King Solomon's nuptial song to his bride was reinterpreted as the love and union between Christ and the Church, the mystical marriage with the Church as the Bride of Christ.

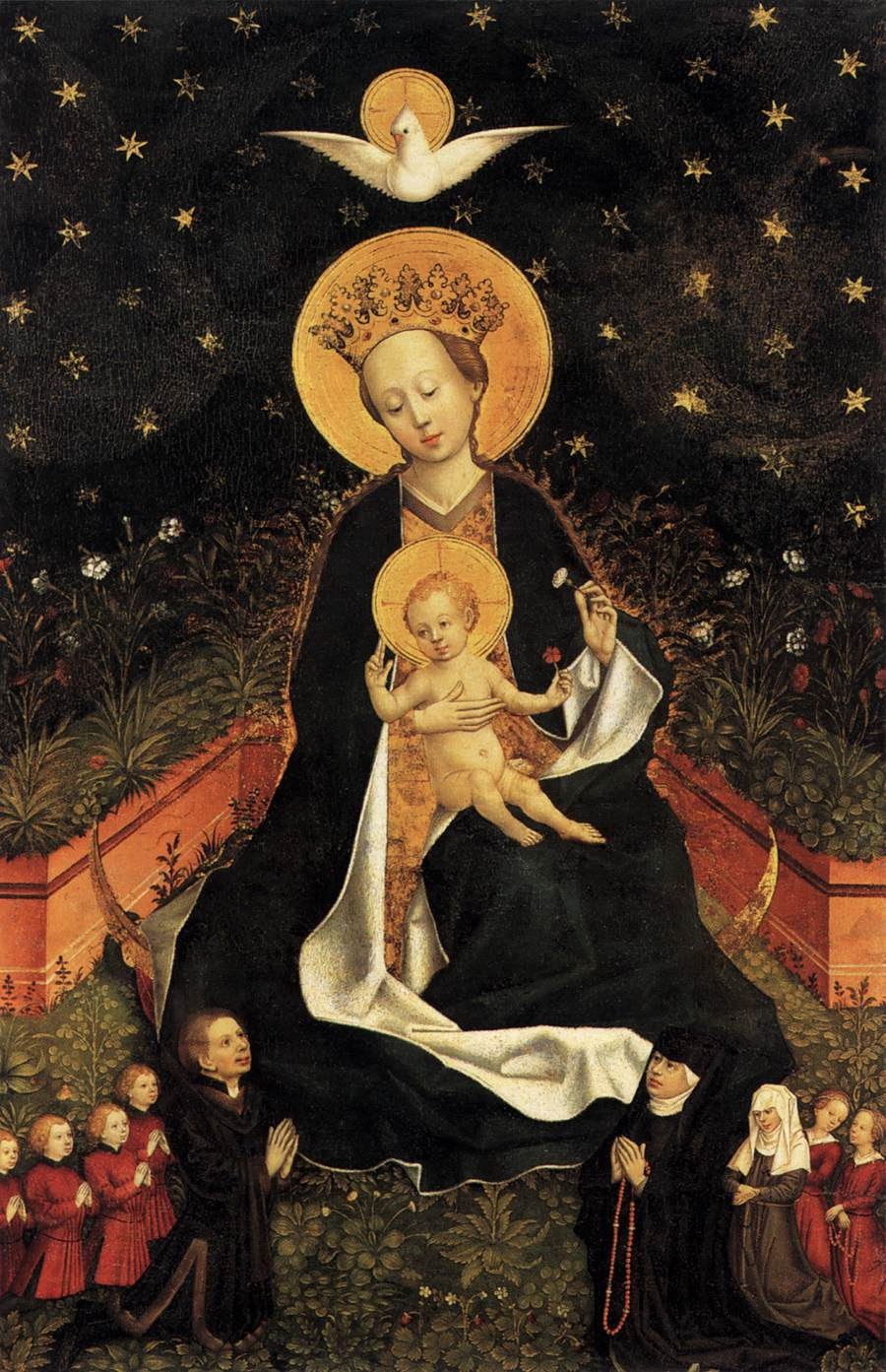
The Madonna on a Crescent Moon in Hortus Conclusus by an anonymous painter

The verse "Thou art all fair, my love; there is no spot in thee" (4.7) from the Song was also regarded as a scriptural confirmation of the developing and still controversial doctrine of Mary's Immaculate Conception – being born without Original Sin ("macula" is Latin for spot).

Christian tradition states that Jesus Christ was conceived to Mary miraculously and without disrupting her virginity by the Holy Spirit, the third person of the Holy Trinity. As such, Mary in late medieval and Renaissance art, illustrating the long-held doctrine of the perpetual virginity of Mary, as well as the Immaculate Conception, was shown in or near a walled garden or yard. This was a representation of her "closed off" womb, which was to remain untouched, and also of her being protected, as by a wall, from sin. In the Grimani Breviary, scrolling labels identify the emblematic objects betokening the Immaculate Conception: the enclosed garden (hortus conclusus), the tall cedar (cedrus exalta), the well of living waters (puteus aquarum viventium), the olive tree (oliva speciosa), the fountain in the garden (fons hortorum), the rosebush (plantatio rosae). Not all actual medieval horti conclusi even strove to include all these details, the olive tree in particular being insufficiently hardy for northern European gardens.

The enclosed garden is recognizable in Fra Angelico's Annunciation (illustration at above left), dating from 1430-32.

Two pilgrimage sites are dedicated to Mary of the Enclosed Garden in the Dutch-Flemish cultural area. One is the statue at the hermitage-chapel in Warfhuizen: "Our Lady of the Enclosed Garden". The second, Onze Lieve Vrouw van Tuine (literally "Our Lady of the Garden"), is venerated at the cathedral of Ypres.

== Actual gardens ==
All gardens are by definition enclosed or bounded spaces, but the enclosure may be somewhat open and consist only of columns, low hedges or fences. An actual walled garden, literally surrounded by a wall, is a subset of gardens. The meaning of hortus conclusus suggests a more private style of garden.

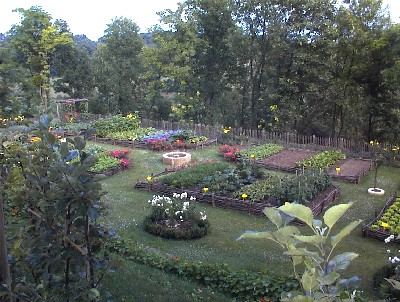
Medieval-style garden from Coucy, France

In the history of gardens the High Medieval hortus conclusus typically had a well or fountain at the center, bearing its usual symbolic freight (see "Fountain of Life") in addition to its practical uses. The convention of four paths that divided the square enclosure into quadrants was so strong that the pattern was employed even where the paths led nowhere. All medieval gardens were enclosed, protecting the private precinct from public intrusion, whether by folk or by stray animals. The enclosure might be as simple as woven wattle fencing or of stout or decorative masonry; or it might be enclosed by trelliswork tunneled pathways in a secular garden or by an arcaded cloister, for communication or meditative pacing.

The origin of the cloister is in the Roman colonnaded peristyle, as garden histories note. The ruined and overgrown Roman villas that were so often remade as the site of Benedictine monasteries had lost their planted garden features with the first decades of abandonment: "gardening, more than architecture, more than painting, more than music, and far more than literature, is an ephemeral art; its masterpieces disappear, leaving little trace." Georgina Masson observed: "When, in 1070, the abbey of Cassino was rebuilt, the garden was described as 'a paradise in the Roman fashion'." But it may have been merely "the aura of the great classical tradition" alone that had survived. The ninth-century idealised plan of Saint Gall (illustration) shows an arcaded cloister with a central well and cross-paths from the centers of each range of arcading. But when a consciously patterned garden was revived for the medieval cloister, the patterning came through Norman Sicily and its hybrid culture that adapted many Islamic elements, in this case the enclosed North African courtyard gardens, ultimately based on the Persian garden tradition.

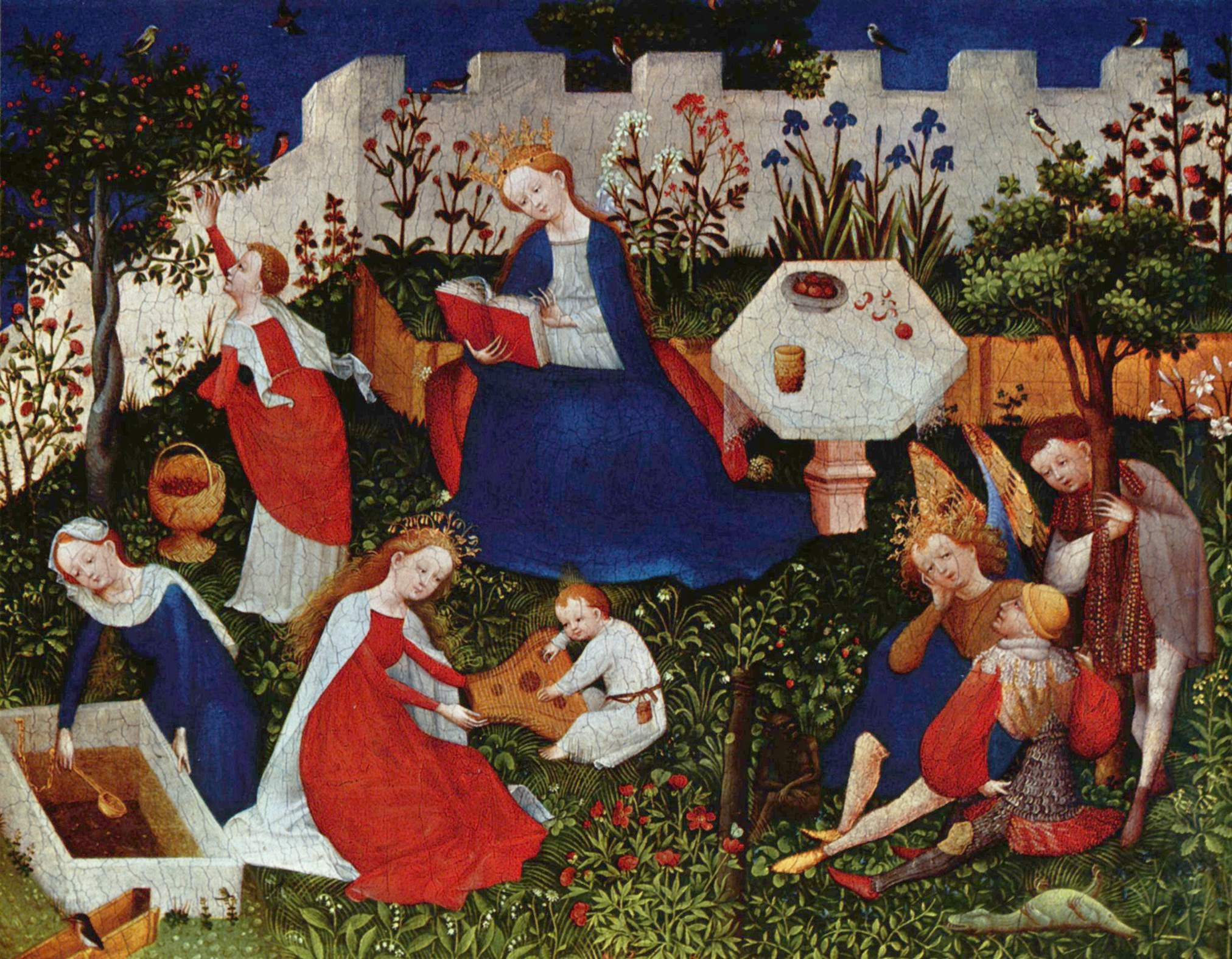
Hortus conclusus depicted by the Upper Rhenish Master

The practical enclosed garden was laid out in the treatise by Pietro Crescenzi of Bologna, Liber ruralium commodorum, a work that was often copied, as the many surviving manuscripts of its text attest, and often printed in the fifteenth and sixteenth centuries. Late medieval paintings and illuminations in manuscripts such as for The Romance of the Rose – where the garden in the text is largely allegorical – often show a turfed bank for a seat as a feature of the hortus conclusus. Only in the fifteenth century, at first in Italy, did some European gardens begin to look outward.

Sitting, walking and playing music were the activities most often portrayed in the numerous fifteenth-century paintings and illuminated manuscripts, where strenuous activities were inappropriate. In Rome, a late fifteenth-century cloister at San Giovanni dei Genovesi was constructed for the use of the Genoese natio, an Ospitium Genoensium, as a plaque still proclaims, which provided shelter in cubicles off its vaulted encircling arcades, and a meeting place and shelter reuniting those from the distant home city.

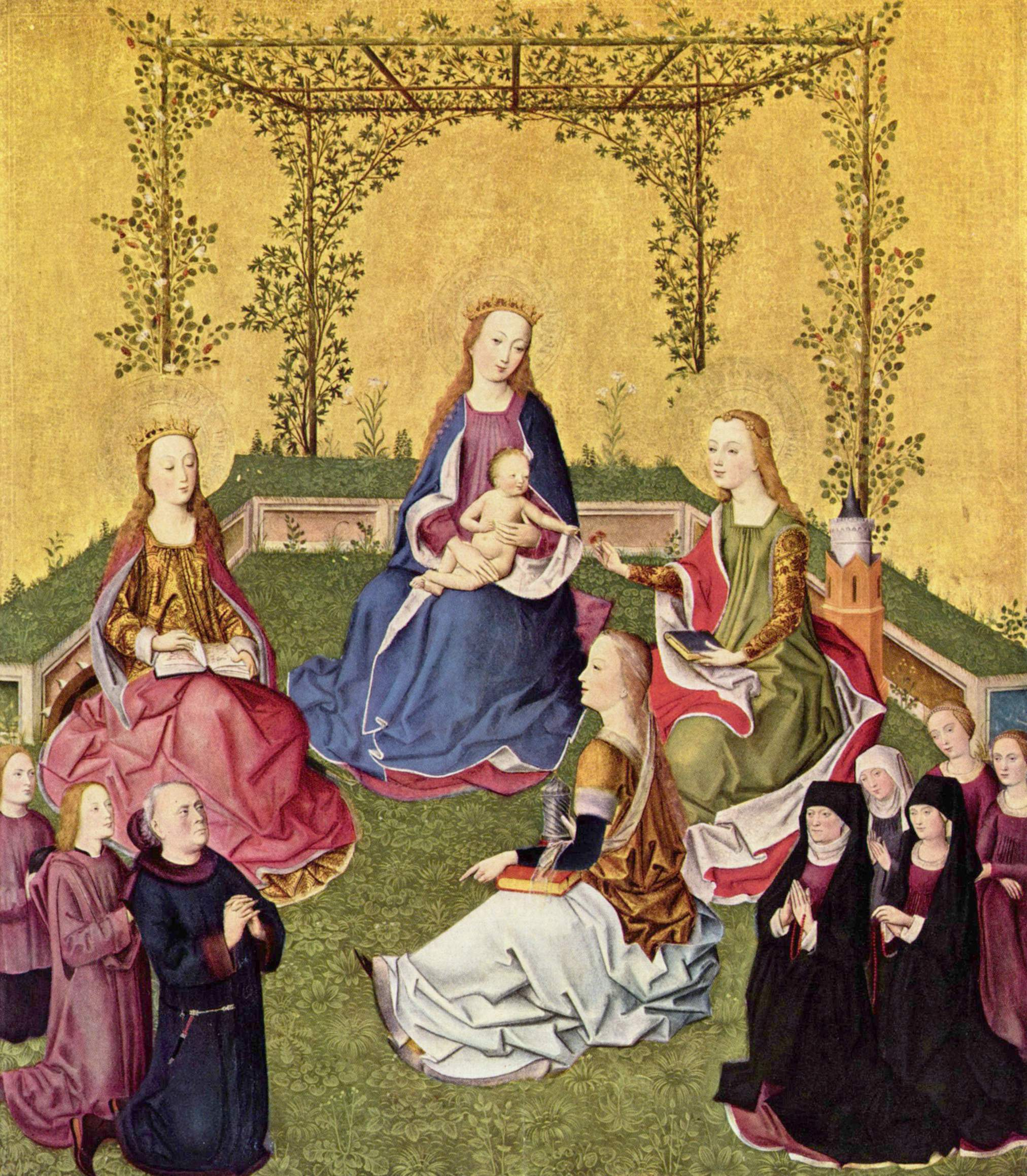
Virgin and Child with saints and donor family, Cologne, c. 1430

Somewhat earlier, Pietro Barbo, who became Pope Paul II in 1464, began the construction of a hortus conclusus, the Palazzetto del Giardino di San Marco, attached to the Venetian Cardinals' Roman seat, the Palazzo Venezia. It served as Paul's private garden during his papacy; inscriptions stress its secular functions as sublimes moenibus hortos...ut relevare animum, durasque repellere curas, a garden of sublime delights, a retreat from cares, and praise it in classicising terms as the home of the dryads, suggesting that there was a central grove of trees, and mentioning its snowy-white stuccoed porticoes. An eighteenth-century engraving shows a tree-covered central mount, which has been recreated in the modern replanting, with box-bordered cross and saltire gravelled paths.

The Farnese Gardens (Orti Farnesiani sul Palatino – or "Gardens of Farnese upon the Palatine") were created by Vignola in 1550 on Rome's northern Palatine Hill, for Cardinal Alessandro Farnese (1520–89). These become the first private botanical gardens in Europe (the first botanical gardens of any kind in Europe being started by Italian universities in the mid-16th century, only a short time before). Alessandro called his summer home at the site Horti Farnesiani, probably in reference to the hortus conclusus. These gardens were also designed in the Roman peristylium style with a central fountain.

== In art ==
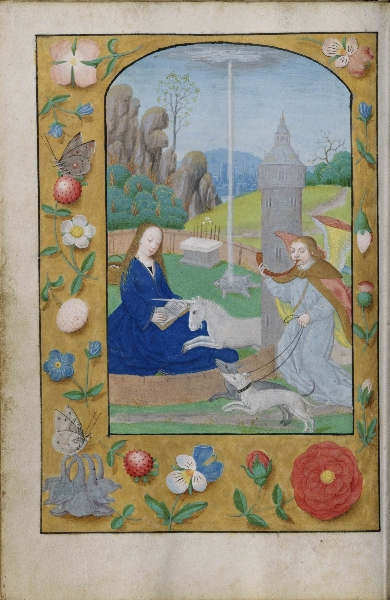
Hunt of the Unicorn Annunciation (c. 1500) from a Netherlandish Book of Hours. In this example Gideon's fleece is worked in as well, and the altar at the rear has Aaron's rod that miraculously flowered in the centre. Both are types for the Annunciation.

The hortus conclusus was one of a number of depictions of the Virgin in the late Middle Ages developed to be more informal and intimate than the traditional hieratic enthroned Virgin adopted from Byzantine icons, or the Coronation of the Virgin. The subject began as a specific metaphor for the Annunciation, but tended to develop into a relaxed sacra conversatione, with several figures beside the Virgin seated, and less specific associations. Germany and the Netherlands in the 15th century saw the peak popularity of this depiction of the Virgin, usually with Child, and very often a crowd of angels, saints and donors, in the garden; the garden by itself, to represent the Virgin, was much rarer. Often walls or trellises close off the sides and rear, or it may be shown as open, except for raised banks, to a landscape beyond. Sometimes, as with a Gerard David's The Virgin and Child with Saints and Donor (below) the garden is very fully depicted; at other times, as in engravings by Martin Schongauer, only a wattle fence and a few sprigs of grass serve to identify the theme. Italian painters typically also keep plants to a minimum, and do not have grass benches. A sub-variety of the theme was the German "Madonna of the Roses", sometimes attempted in sculptured altarpieces. The image was rare in Orthodox icons, but there are at least some Russian examples.

One type of depiction, not usually compatible with correct perspective, concentrates on showing the whole wall and several garden structures or features that symbolize the mystery of Christ's conception, mostly derived from the Song of Songs or other Biblical passages as interpreted by theological writers. These may include one or more temple or church-like buildings, an Ivory Tower (SS 7.4), an open-air altar with Aaron's rod flowering, surrounded by the bare rods of the other tribes, a gatehouse "tower of David, hung with shields" (SS 7.4), with the gate closed, the Ark of the Covenant, a well (often covered), a fountain, and the morning sun above (SS 6.10). This type of depiction usually shows the Annunciation, although sometimes the child Jesus is held by Mary.

A rather rare, late 15th century, variant of this depiction was to combine the Annunciation in the hortus conclusus with the Hunt of the Unicorn and Virgin and Unicorn, so popular in secular art. The unicorn already functioned as a symbol of the Incarnation and whether this meaning is intended in many prima facie secular depictions can be a difficult matter of scholarly interpretation. There is no such ambiguity in the scenes where the archangel Gabriel is shown blowing a horn, as hounds chase the unicorn into the Virgin's arms, and a little Christ Child descends on rays of light from God the Father. The Council of Trent finally banned this somewhat over-elaborated, if charming, depiction, partly on the grounds of realism, as no one now believed the unicorn to be a real animal. In the 16th century the subject of the hortus conclusus drifts into the open air Sacra Conversazione and the Madonnas in a landscape of Giovanni Bellini, Albrecht Dürer and Raphael, where it is hard to say if an allusion is intended.

An exhibition of later medieval visual representations of hortus inclusus was mounted at Dumbarton Oaks, Washington DC; the exhibition drew a distinction between "garden representations as thematic reinforcements and those that seemingly treat the garden as a subject in itself"; in reviewing it Timothy Husband, warned against uncritical interpretation of the refined detail in manuscript illuminations' "seemingly objective representation". "Late medieval garden imagery, by subjugating direct observation to symbolic or allegorical intention, reflects more a state of mind than reality," if a disjunct can be detected where the objects of the world shimmered with pregnant allegorical meaning. South Netherlandish illuminations and painting appear to document the "turf benches, fountains, raised beds, 'estrade' trees, potted plants, walkways, enclosing walls, trellises, wattle fences and bowers" familiar to contemporary viewers, but assembled into an illusion of reality.

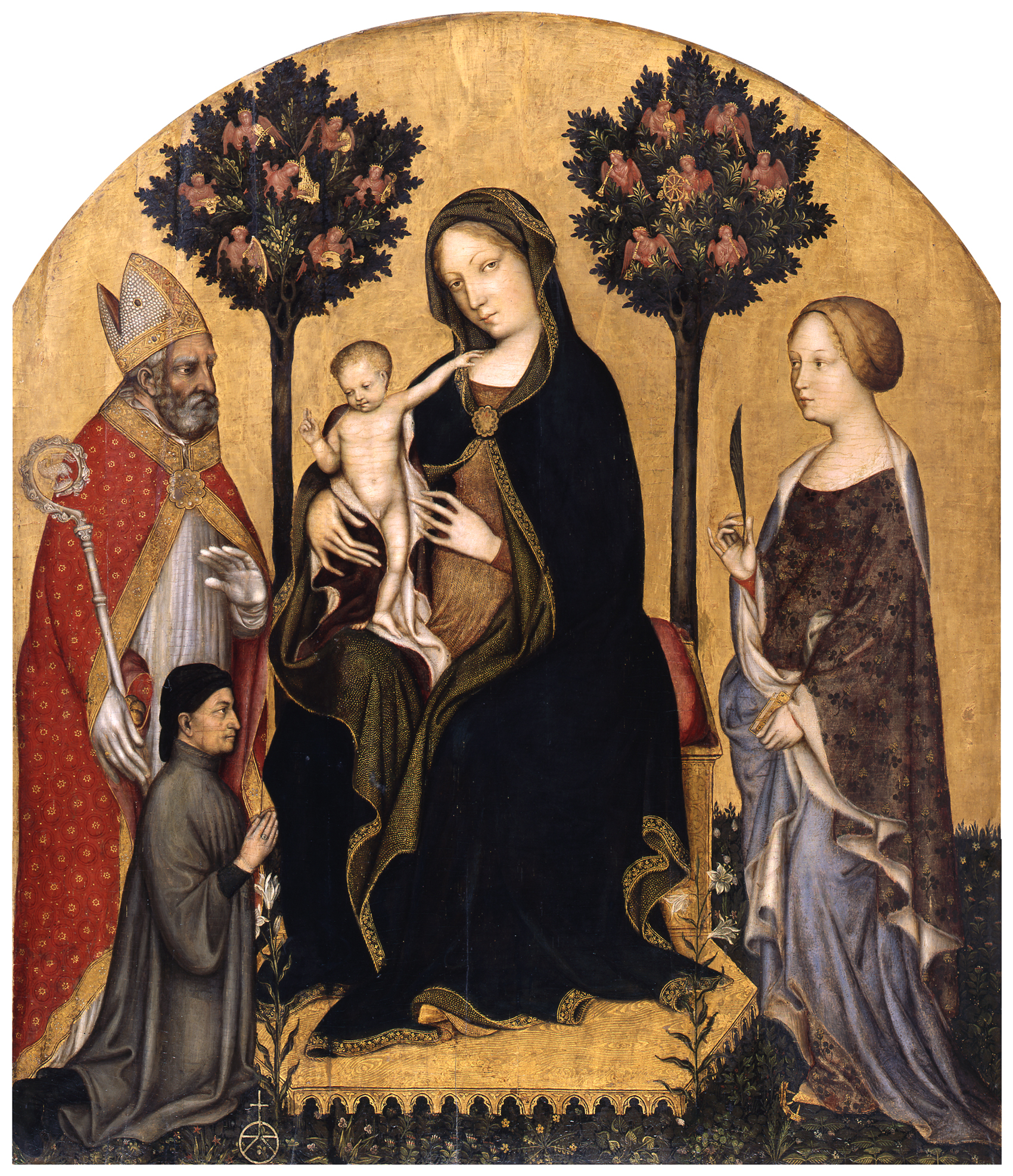
Gentile da Fabriano

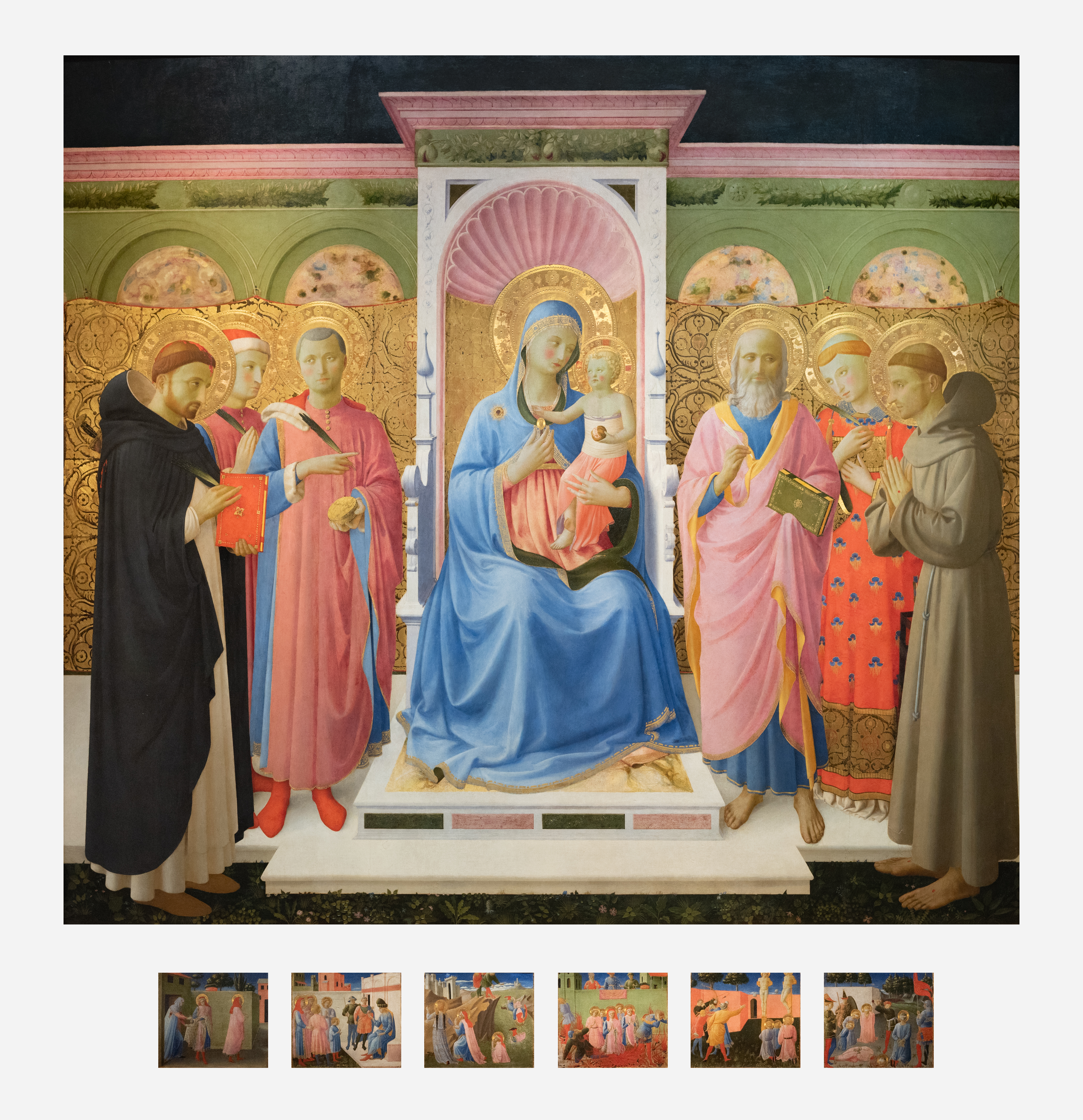
Fra Angelico

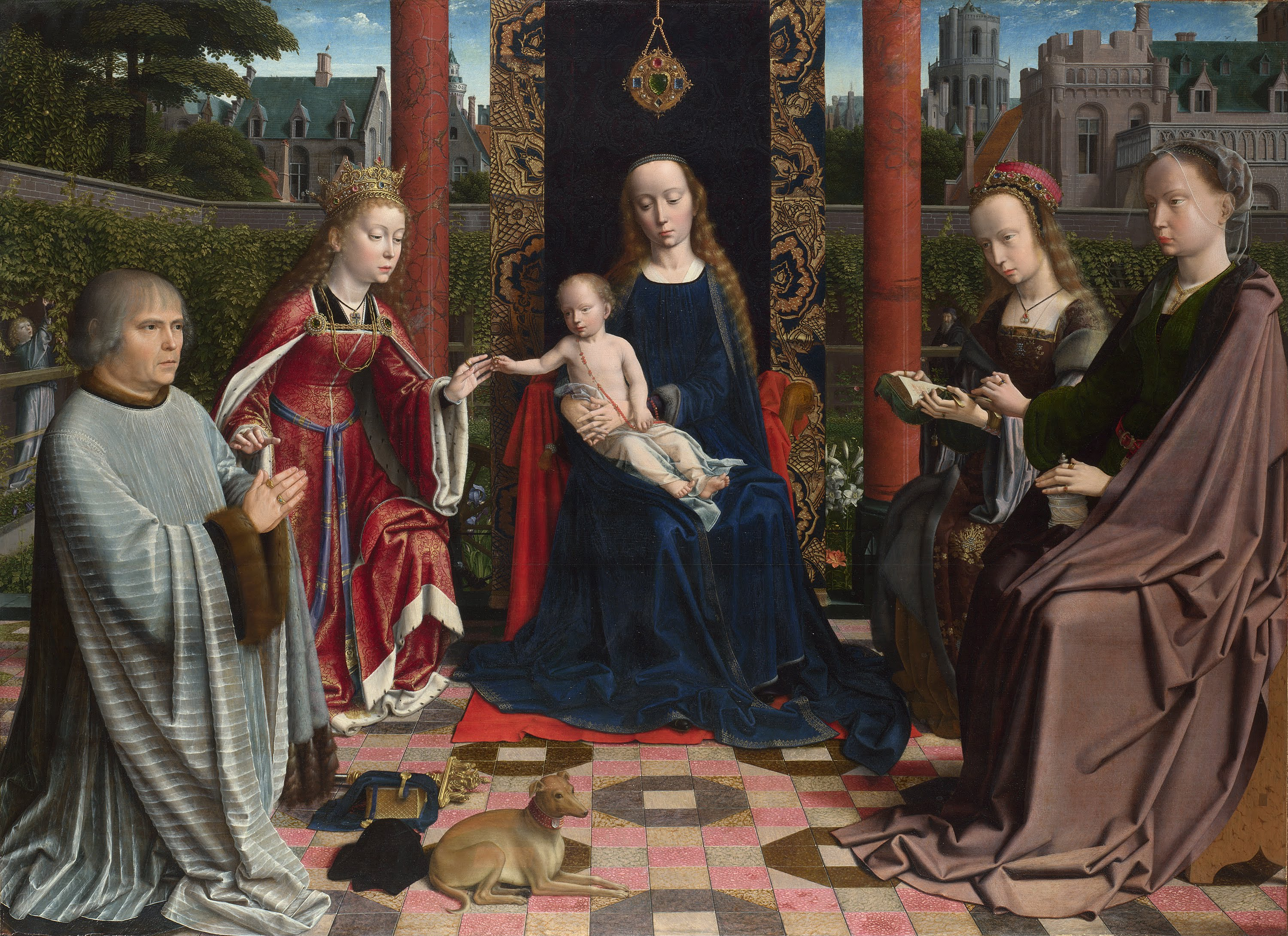
Gerard David

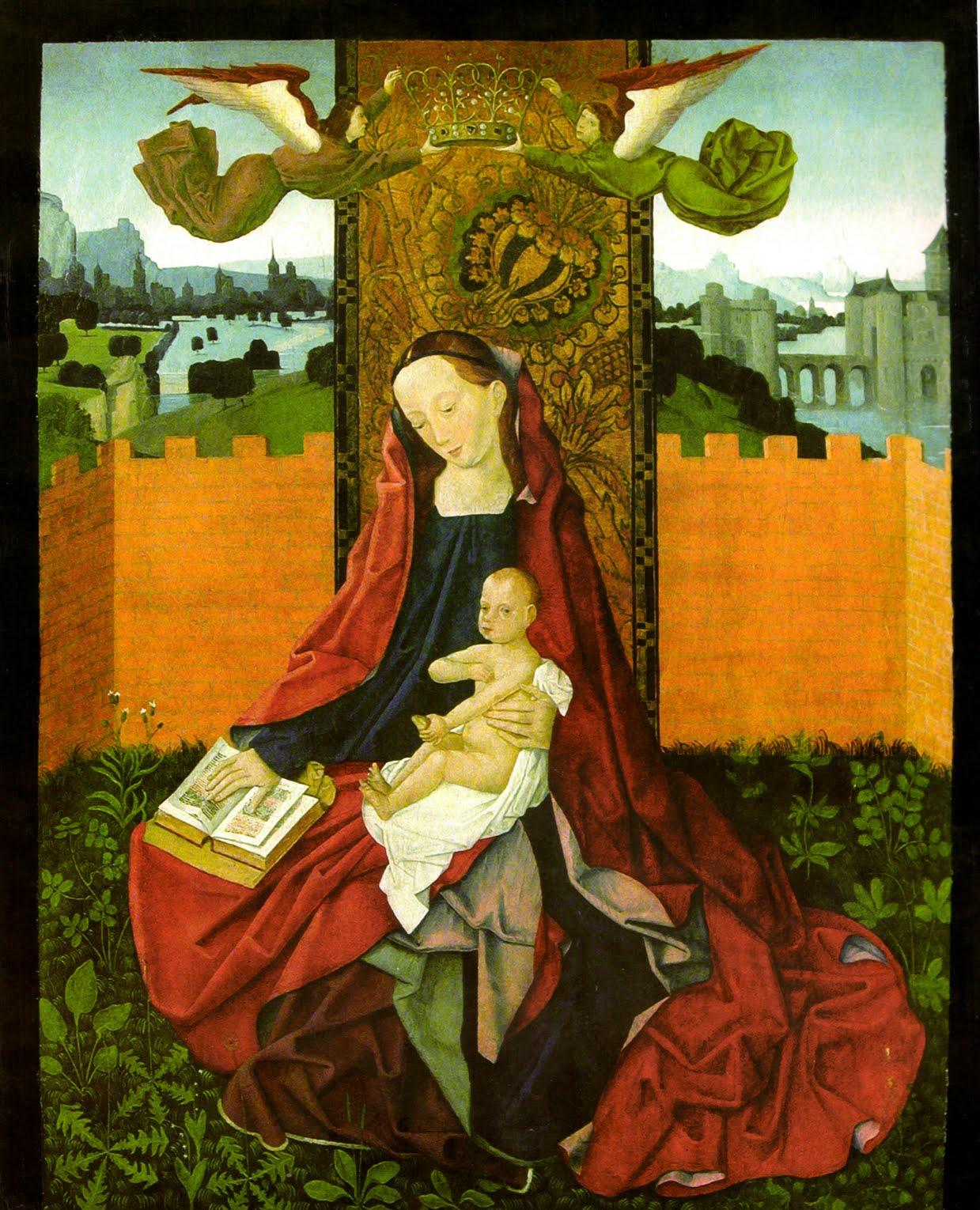
Style of Dieric Bouts

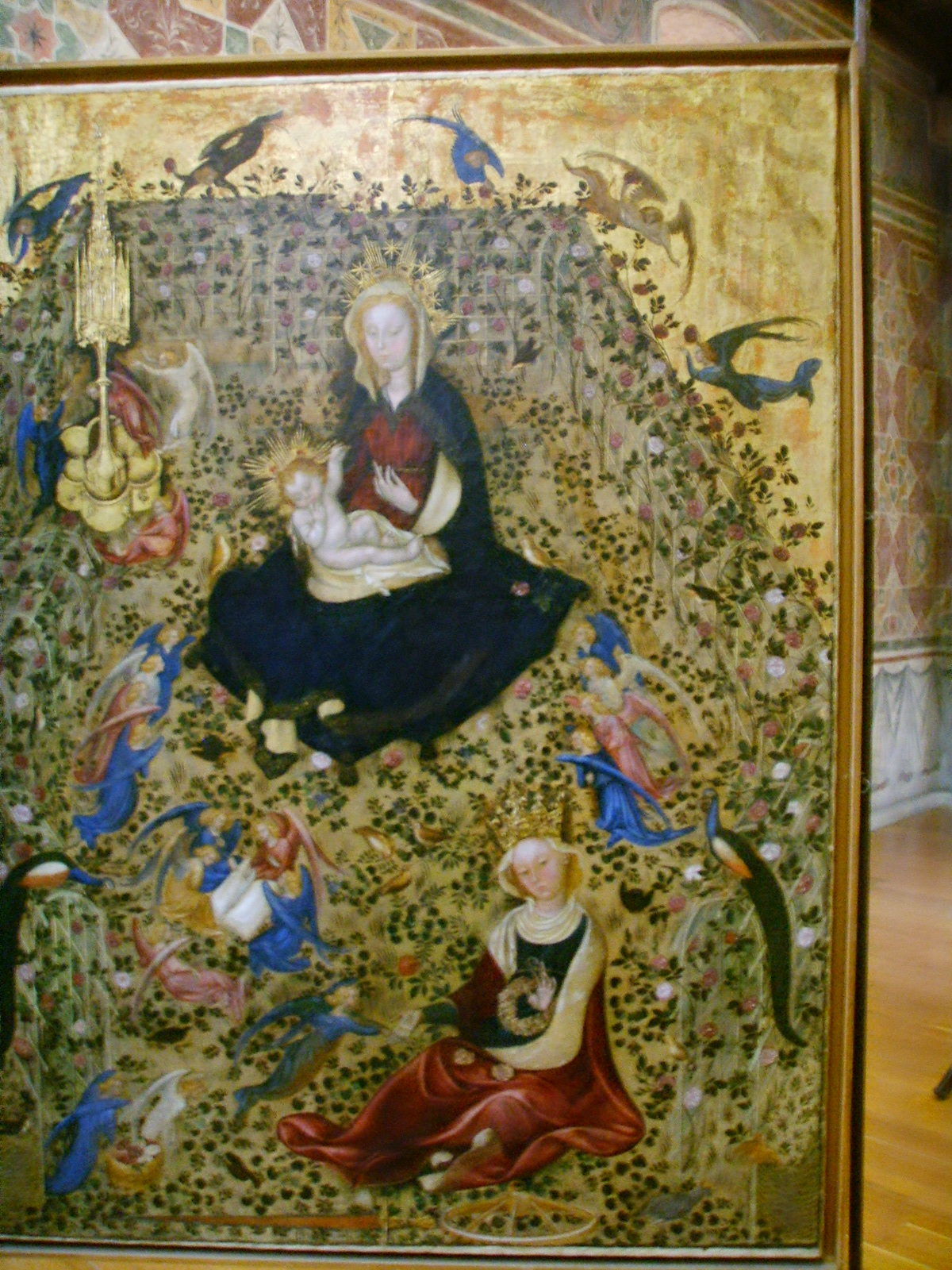
Italian miniature, c. 1435

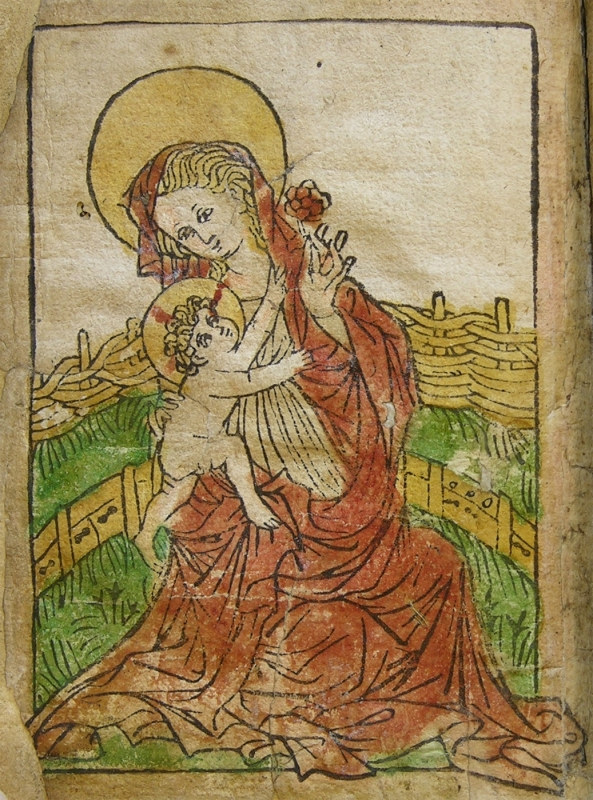
Early woodcut, c. 1460, hand-coloured

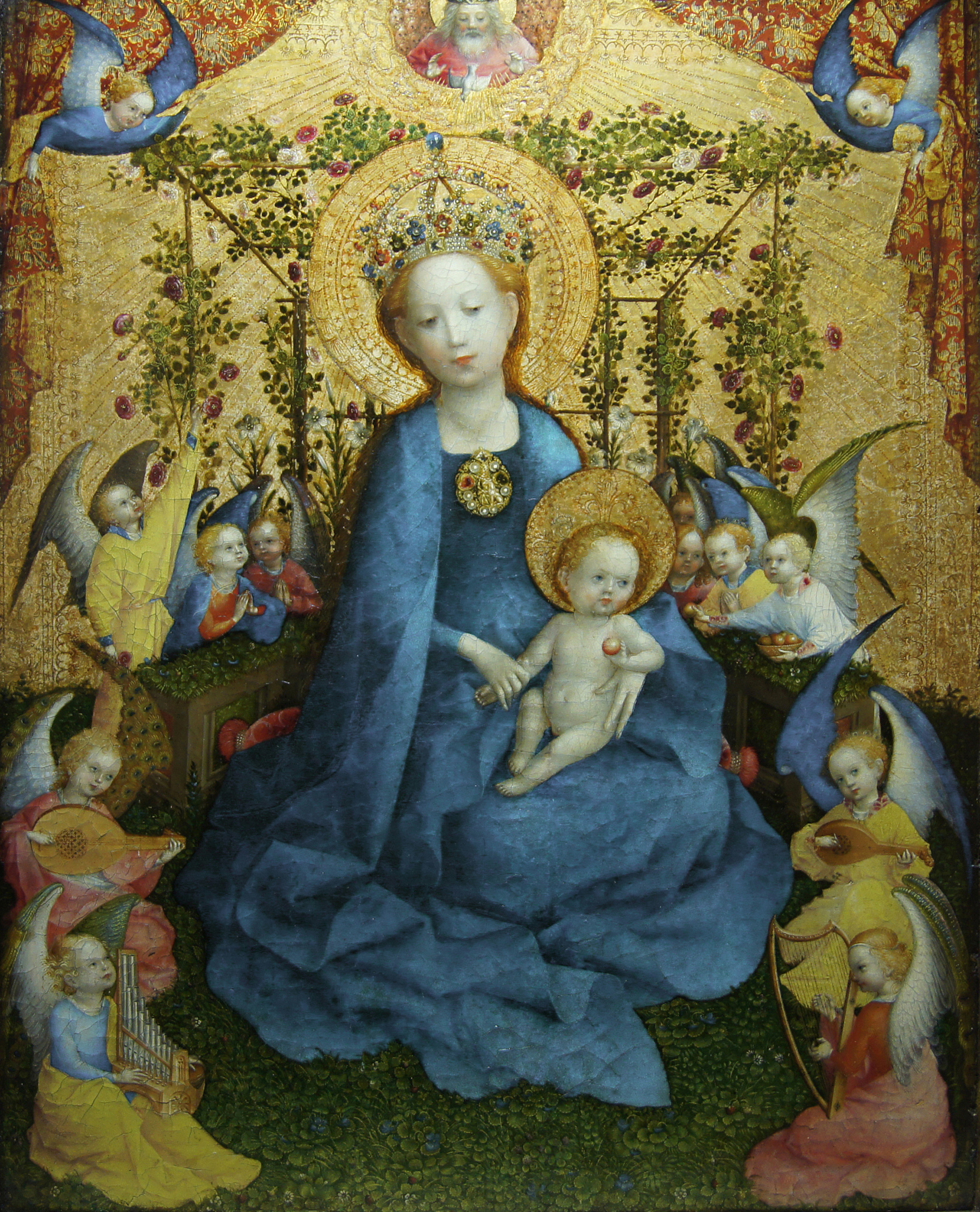
Stefan Lochner

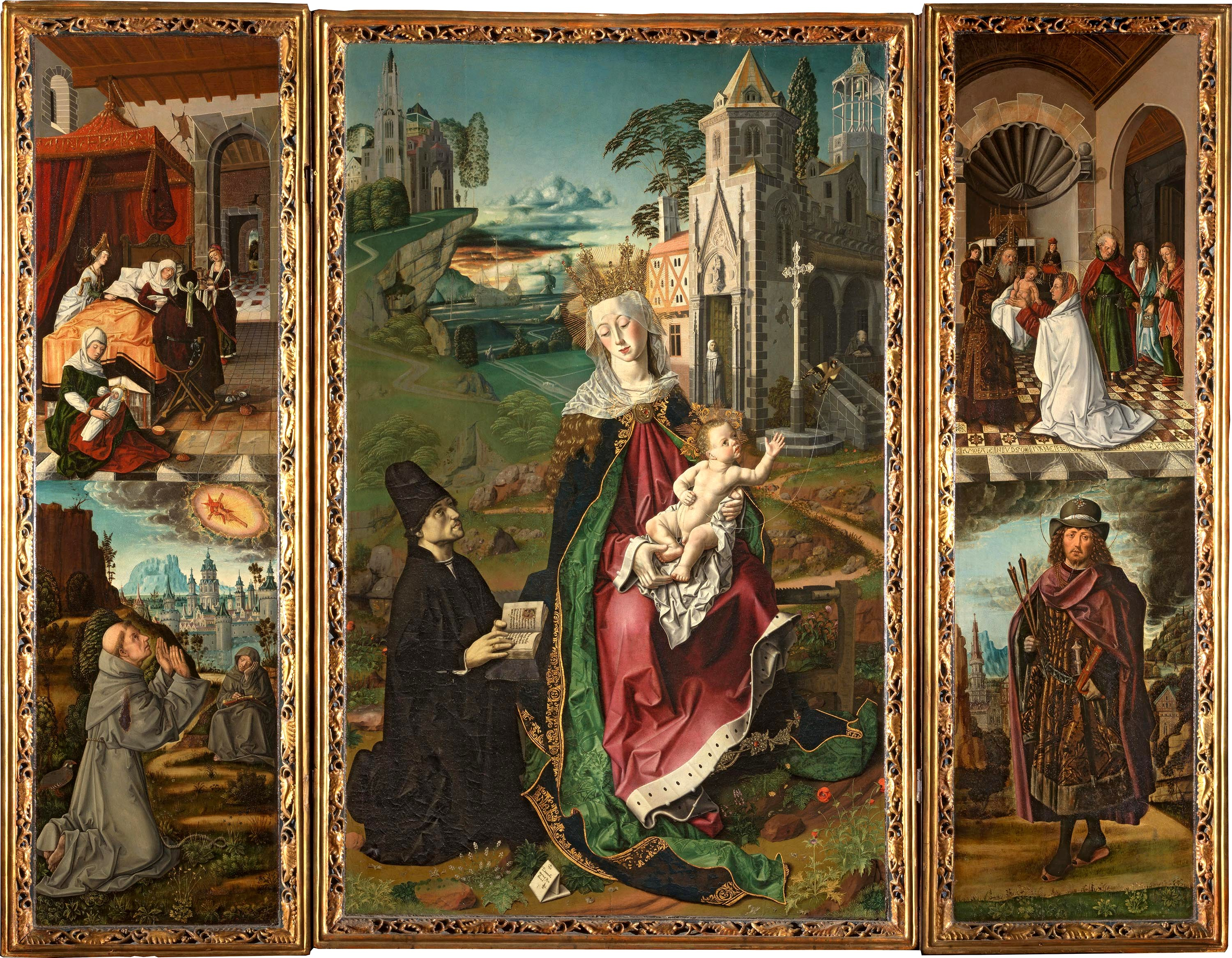
Bartolomé Bermejo, Virgen de Montserrat altarpiece, 1485

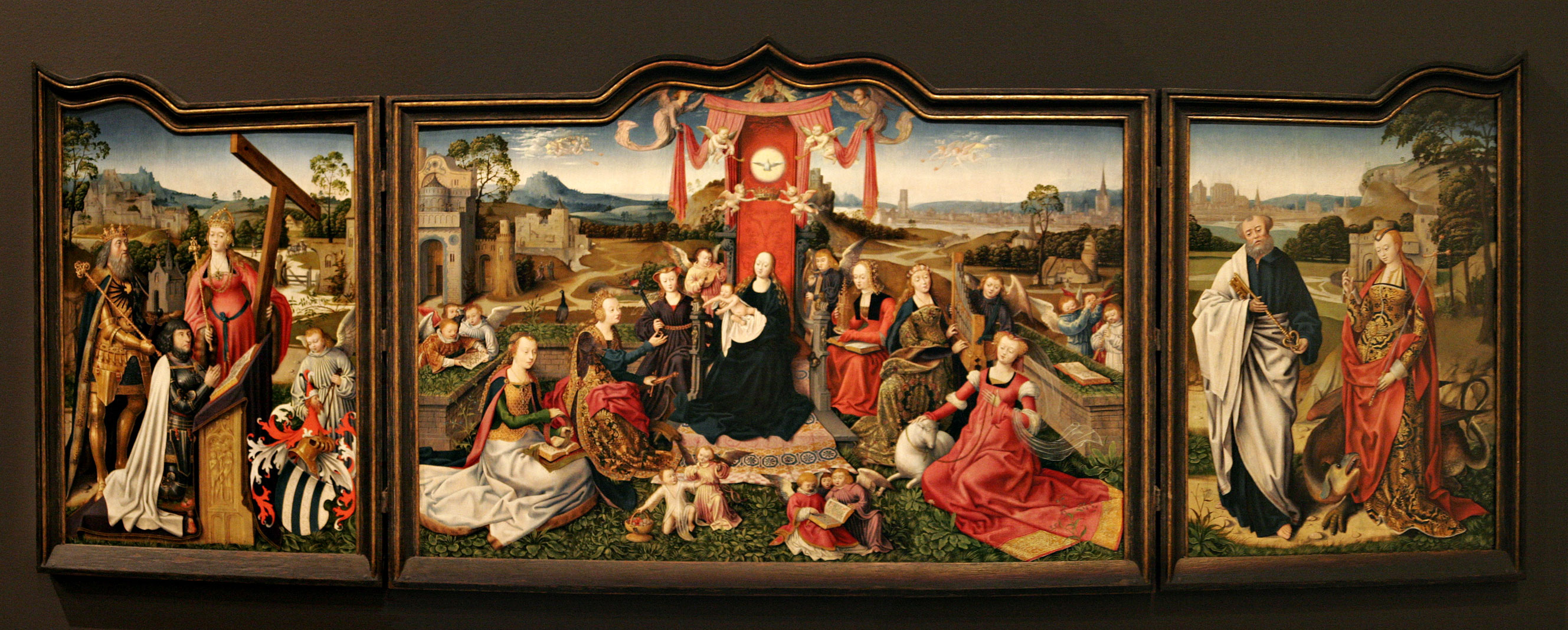
Cologne, ca. 1520

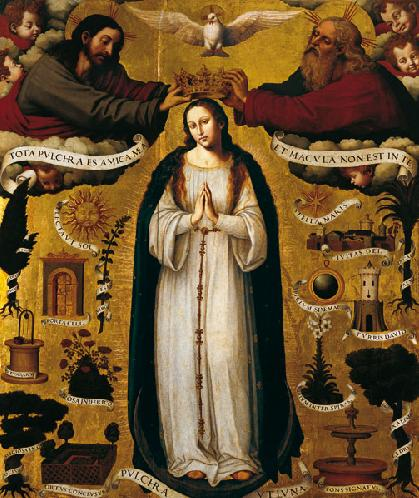
Juan de Juanes, after 1530

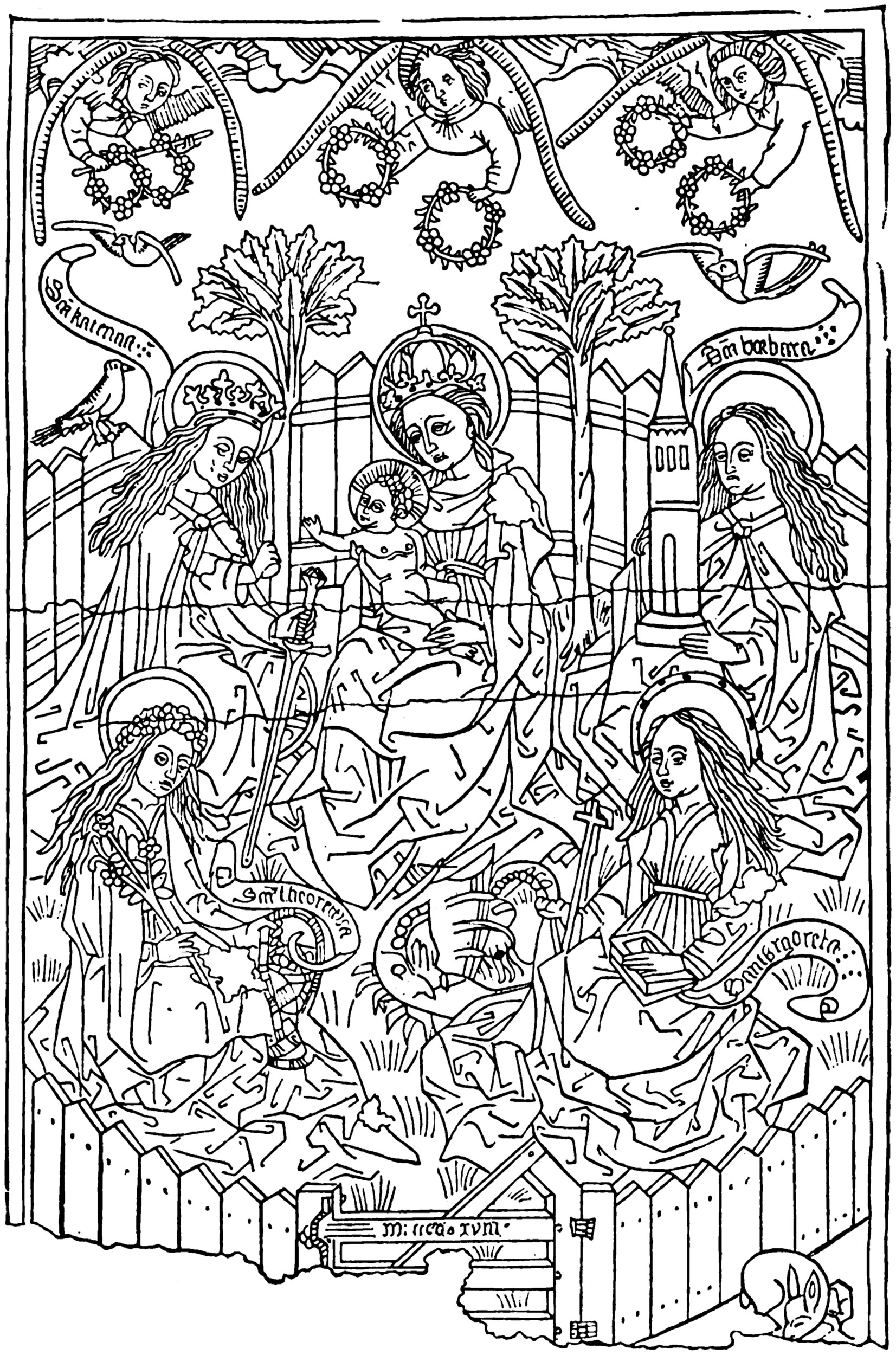
Woodcut dated 1418, but probably 1450s

== Modern cultural references ==
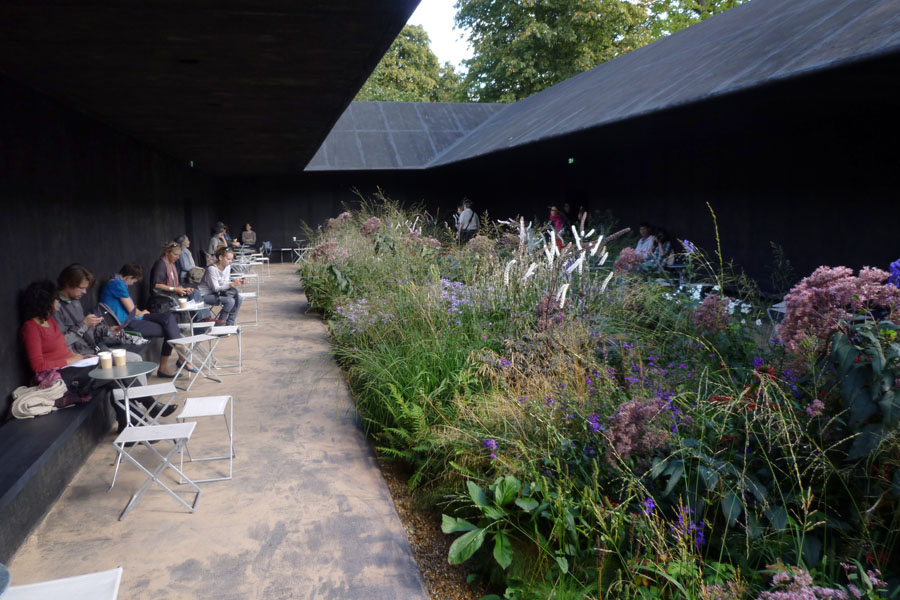
Serpentine Pavilion, Hyde Park, Peter Zumthor.

The concept for the 2011 Serpentine Gallery Pavilion was the hortus conclusus, a contemplative room, a garden within a garden. Designed by Swiss architect Peter Zumthor and with a garden created by Piet Oudolf, the Pavilion was a place abstracted from the world of noise and traffic and the smells of London – an interior space within which to sit, to walk, to observe the flowers.

== See also ==
- Artas, Bethlehem, location of the Catholic Convent of the Hortus Conclusus
- Gaston Bachelard
- Locus amoenus
- Topophilia
- Renaissance garden
