= Cicerone Press =

English publisher specialising in guidebooks

- Industry: Publishing
- Headquarters: Kendal, Cumbria, England
- Products: Travel guides
- Website: Official website

Cicerone Press is an English publisher, founded in 1969, specialising in guidebooks for walkers, climbers, trekkers and cyclists.

The company's first publication was a climbing guide to the English Lake District, and over the past 50 years they have published a range of guidebooks covering walking, trekking and cycling around the world.

== History ==
The company was founded in 1969 when the late Walt Unsworth (1928-2017) and Brian Evans, in frustration at the lack of suitable climbing guides to areas of the English Lake District, came together to produce a climbing guide.

The very first guide, The Northern Lake District was published in March 1969. It consisted of just 40 pages and included hand-drawn illustrations by Evans who, two years later, wrote and illustrated a companion guide to climbs in The Southern Lake District, Cicerone's second title. Winter Climbs in Ben Nevis and Glencoe followed later the same year.

Since 1999, Cicerone has been developing under the ownership of Jonathan and Lesley Williams. The company is based in Kendal, Cumbria.

The Cicerone podcast 'Footnotes' was first released in 2020 and new episodes are available twice a month. The company also hosts a monthly Cicerone Live event with authors and guest speakers, events are streamed live on the Cicerone website, YouTube, and Facebook.

In 2008, readers of Walk Magazine, published by the Ramblers Association, voted Cicerone guides into first place in the "Best Walking Book" category of their annual "Top Gear Awards".

In 2019, the Cicerone Press celebrated its 50th anniversary with the publication of Cicerone: Celebrating Fifty Years of Adventure, edited by Kev Reynolds.
