= Charles-François Richard =

French industrialist (1772–1851)

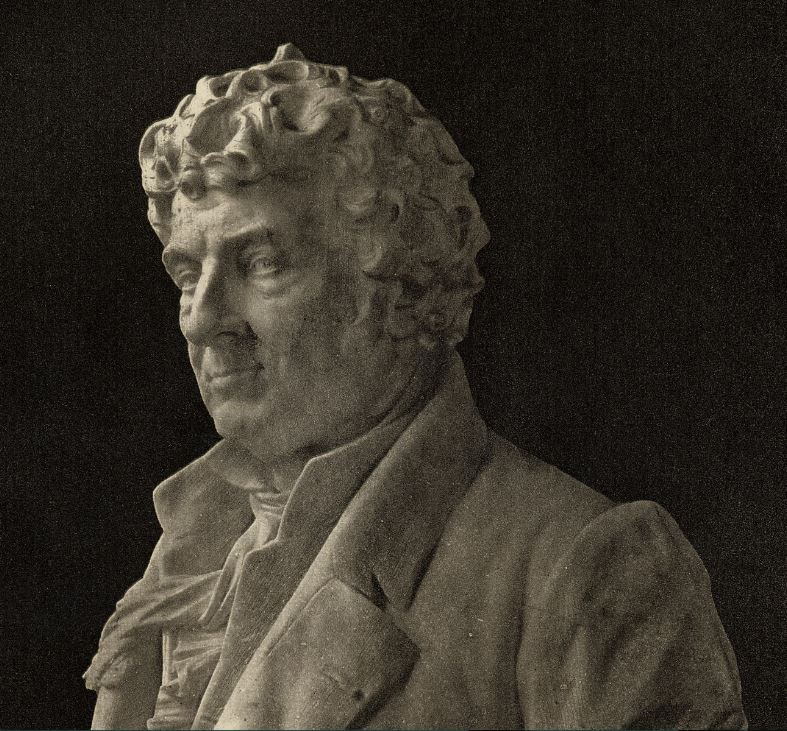
- Photo of a section of a heliogravure by Félix Thiollier after a bust by Pierre Aubert.
- Born: 9 August 1772; Bourg-Argental (France)
- Died: 15 April 1851 (aged 78); Saint-Chamond, Loire (France)
- Other name: Richard-Chambovet
- Occupation: Manufacturing
- Father: Jean-Louis Richard (de Maisonneuve)
- Family: Famille Richard (Lyonnais)
- Honours: Legion of Honour, Decoration of the Lily

Signature
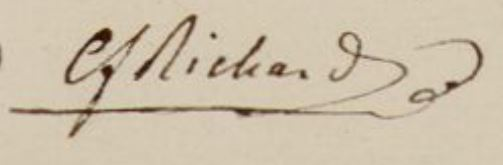

Charles-François Richard, also known as Richard-Chambovet (born 9 August 1772 in Bourg-Argental, Forez province; died 15 April 1851 in Saint-Chamond, Loire department), was a French silk industrialist, and more notably the initiator of the lace industry.

After a brief military interlude - due to the revolutionary turmoil - his beginnings as a miller were modest. He then established himself as a passementier specializing in the manufacture of padous, the ribbons needed for culottes and catogans. But ruined for the first time by the general economic slump, fashion later abandoned them for good, putting an end to the business. Looking for a new direction, Richard went to the brand-new Musée des Arts et Métiers, where he met Joseph de Montgolfier. There, he found a rudimentary braiding loom that produced round-section elements - until then, weaving looms had only been able to produce flat elements - and from then on, he worked tirelessly to improve it.

Thus, this pioneer paved the way for the industrial manufacture of laces. On the one hand, he innovated by developing these looms, and on the other, he added a steam engine as a driving force. Later, he remained a pioneer, installing a central-heating boiler in his workshops, which increased profitability and enabled more meticulous work. Finally, he equipped his workshops with gas lighting to boost productivity.

As part of the nascent industrial revolution, Charles-François Richard was at the origin of an industry that dominated Europe and was recognized as far afield as America. The production of laces was of prime importance at this time: they were very widespread haberdashery items, used for a variety of fastenings. As a result, the town of Saint-Chamond, where Richard settled, became a major player in this field.

== Biography ==
Baptized on 9 August 1772, the day of his birth in Bourg-Argental, Charles-François Richard was the second of six siblings. His parents were Jean-Louis Richard, a court clerk and future deputy to the Estates General of 1789, and Marie Chevalier. Involved in the silk industry, the household earned part of its income from the cultivation of mulberry trees on which silkworms were raised.

At the age of twenty-one, with the National Guards of Saint-Étienne and Montbrison, he went to Lyon to help with the city's uprising against the National Convention. On 11 fructidor year I (28 August 1793), his detachment, posted to protect the arrival of a convoy of grain from Forez, successfully confronted a besieging formation. But, abandoned by his family, he became a "forgotten sentry [...] [who] tried in vain to return to Lyon, [who] obtained peasant's clothes and returned to Bourg-Argental [...]". Outlawed, he enlisted in Tournon in the 4th battalion of Ardèche volunteers. This unit, formed on the 4th Complementary Day of Year I (20 September 1793) in Bourg-Saint-Andéol, was commanded by Louis-Gabriel Suchet, from a family of silk merchants. After the siege of Toulon, he joined his father Jean-Louis Richard, also a proscribe, in the same battalion in Marseille. This commitment was sometimes physically demanding, as his son Ennemond explains: "My father had been a soldier in the Army of Italy; for eight months, he had been deprived of his military bag and had slept with the snow, in the hedges that were half-open and then covered with his coat". His constitution proved robust, however, and the only health problems he encountered later on were limited to urinary stones, which required the intervention of a Parisian surgeon. In 1794, he attained the rank of lieutenant. Then, released from all obligations on 9 Floréal Year IV (28 April 1796) by "the board of directors of the 69th demi-brigade of line infantry", he left the Army of Italy as a supernumerary officer.

On 23 fructidor, year VI (9 September 1798), he married a relative by marriage named Marie Chambovet in Saint-Chamond, from whom he had four children (Note: His four children, born in Saint-Chamond, were: Jean Louis François (30 brumaire an XIII (21 November 1804)), Ennemond Julien (25 January 1806), François Jules (12 January 1815), Jeanne Françoise Marie Louise (10 September 1820).) and from whom he took his customary name "Richard-Chambovet".

By 1817, working in the silk industry, he was an established industrialist. The six-member Chambre consultative des arts et manufactures de Saint-Étienne elected him miller. (Note: As "moulinier" (miller), as it seems that the activity of "lace maker" was not yet recognized.) After its dissolution in 1792, the Société d'agriculture, arts et commerce de l'arrondissement de Saint-Étienne was recreated in 1820. His first Bulletin, from 1823, indicates that he is a member. In 1824, this Society published part of the notice princeps in which he described his early career. The commentary was laudatory, as Saint-Chamond, under his impetus, became the capital of shoelaces. In 1827, Richard-Chambovet had a hôtel particulier built as a testament to his success, with a garden that reached as far as the city limits. (Note: The Richard-Chambovet mansion has coordinates 45° 28′ 35″ N, 4° 30′ 38″ E.) (Note: The Richard-Chambovet hôtel particulier is U-shaped. At the beginning of the 20th century, its courtyard was enclosed by monumental railings - visible on Wikimedia Commons - which disappeared in the 21st century. Nevertheless, the building is still present at 44-48 rue de la République, although it is divided into apartments with a courtyard filled with housing. "The fronts of the balconies bear the family initials Richard-Chambovet, the year 1827 and the lyre, an antique decorative motif in vogue at the time.") In 1829, probably because of his notability, he was the "temporal godfather" of the new Ursuline house in Saint-Chamond. (Note: The bell, Marie-Charlotte, in the newly erected chapel of the Ursuline house bears his and his wife's first names.) In 1833, he was still listed as a full member of the Society.

Electoral mandates were added to his manufacturing activities. He was a member of the Saint-Chamond town council in 1808. This council favored the Restoration. Its vision of social peace was based on a balance between the divine monarchy, the church, and commercial prosperity. (Note: A table posted at the Saint-Chamond town hall lists all the mayors of this commune since January 1792, without interruption. He does not appear on it. So, contrary to what some sources claim, he was never mayor of Saint-Chamond.) From 1829 to 1831, he was elected mayor of Izieux.

His work was honored with many distinctions. In 1814, he received the decoration of the Lily. (Note: On 27 August 1814 Saint-Chamond's town council requested the King's blessing and the decoration of the Lily. These are described as a distinctive sign that honors friends of the Bourbon throne. The municipal council recalls the industries, morals and attachment of the commune to a religious practice inherited from the ancients and never denied (despite the revolutionary turmoil).) On 20 December 1831 he was made a Knight of the Royal Order of the Legion of Honor. (Note: Opposite, his signature in the Légion d'honneur file.) In 1839, French industrialists awarded his company a silver medal at the Exposition des Produits de l'Industrie Française in Paris. This was awarded not simply for the products exhibited, but for the work accomplished as a whole. It concluded: "Twenty-five to thirty years ago, Saint-Chamond delivered thirty thousand francs' worth of laces to the trade, now it delivers more than two million francs' worth".

In 1839, Richard-Chambovet relinquished his business to his three sons, who adopted "Richard Frères" as their corporate name. Finally, his death was declared on 16 April 1851 by his eldest son, who planned to have him buried in Lyon. (Note: Charles-François Richard - known as Richard-Chambovet - is not buried in the family vault, which houses contemporaries and subsequent generations including his son Jean-Louis Richard(-Vitton), in the former cemetery of La Guillotière (a commune adjacent to Lyon until its amalgamation in 1852), according to a photograph of the tombstone.) The eldest son retired to Château de Montchat before his father's death, and on 30 October 1865 the youngest son retired to Château du Montellier in the Ain region. Eventually, only the second son, Ennemond Richard, took over the business.

In 1889, the industrialist was honored in Saint-Chamond by a road named "rue Richard-Chambovet". In 1890, when the municipality of Saint-Étienne handed over the entire Palais de la Bourse to the Chamber of Commerce, the latter undertook several decoration projects, including busts of Richard-Chambovet, which were donated by the families. Félix Thiollier produced heliogravures of these busts. (Note: The complete Richard-Chambovet heliogravure by Félix Thiollier can be seen here on Wikimedia Commons.) Later, his brother made a presentation on the subject to the aforementioned Chamber. This presentation, printed in 1894, devoted a chapter to Richard-Chambovet.

== Silk industrialist ==
=== Moulinier ===
In 1790 and 1791, Richard was an apprentice miller. (Note: He then learned to "twist or spin silk [raw silk, to make it strong,] with a sort of mill equipped with bobbins and spindles".) In 1792 and 1793, he was employed by a ribbon manufacturer in Saint-Étienne. The French Revolution then took him on a three-year military tour. On his return, he found a position as a miller in Saint-Chamond, with a man named Coron.

=== Passmentier ===
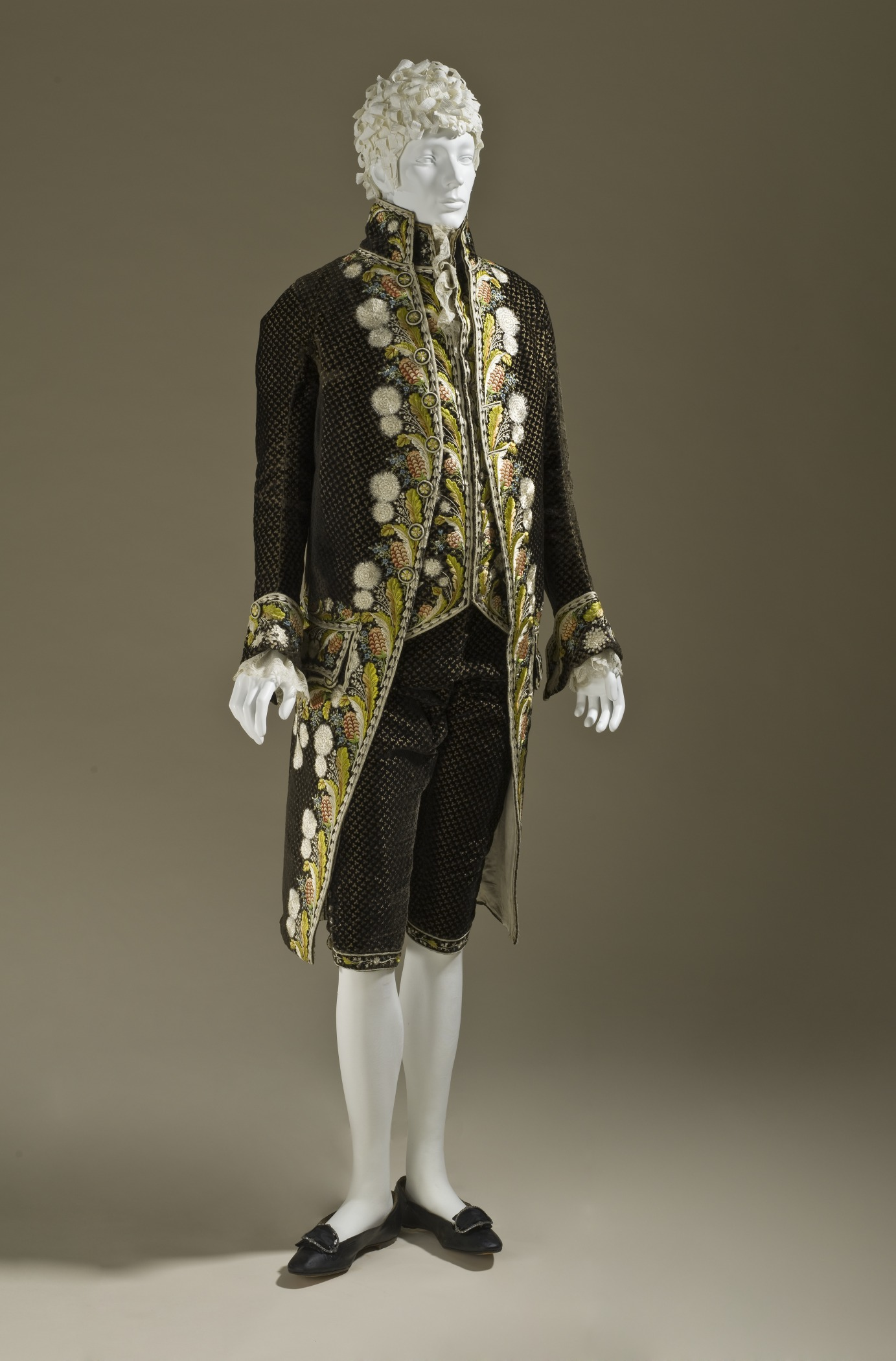
Silk and velvet suit with passementerie and padous. Circa 1800.

In May 1797, he set up shop as a manufacturer of passementerie and padous, which were used to trim garments. (Note: Padou is a "woven ribbon made of half thread and half silk".) They are also used to tie men's hair into catanogans, and to lace shoes. For optimum production, Richard bought many Zurich-style looms (Note: Ribbon mills in the Basel region - like those in Krefeld, Germany - are competitors to those in Saint-Étienne, which is why French manufacturers are keeping a close eye on their technical developments.) (Note: A multi-spindle loom was developed by a mechanic from Zurich. Thus "it was from the village of Aiche [about 14 km from Basle], in Switzerland, that the first 'bar loom' came out, allowing several ribbons to be woven at once. It was called the "Zurich loom".) capable of weaving twelve to twenty-four at a time, depending on the width required: he installed these machines in Saint-Chamond. He also manufactured sewing silks. (Note: Sewing silks" are "silk threads for sewing".) In 1799, the Army of Italy began the Italian campaign against the Second Coalition, with setbacks that caused the already bloodless French state to lose the few territorial conquests that were barely holding it together. In the economic doldrums of the Directoire period, Richard-Chambovet was ruined for the first time.

However, he resumed his activities just as the coup d'état of 18 Brumaire brought economic recovery. It was then that he had to contend with Lyon's industry, which, out of protectionism, forbade dyers and chevilleurs (Note: The chevilleur is "the person who prepares raw silk for manufacturers and merchants.) from working for Saint-Chamond's sewing silk manufacturers, and with fashion, which definitively adopted short hair and abandoned culottes in favor of pants, rendering padous useless. In 1804, for the second time, he went bankrupt.

=== Laces manufacturer ===
==== Conservatoire des arts et métiers ====
Against this backdrop, Richard-Chambovet seemed discouraged. As Thiollier states in his 1894 biographical note: "His family possesses letters written by him at this time, in which he declares that if he were not married, he would immediately return to service to seek glory or death".

He then investigated whether there was a way to increase the production of foil ganses (Note: The foil is a "species of thread made from the coarsest silk material".) from the low heddle looms (Note: Healds are the "moving parts of a weaving loom, by means of which and [with] treadles the warp threads of a fabric are opened to pass the shuttle and consequently the weft thread. [...] When the warp is horizontal, all the weft threads are also in the same horizontal plane, which makes the low heddle; and, if the warp is vertical, the weft threads also form a vertical plane, hence the high heddle".) at Saint-Martin-en-Coailleux. (Note: The communes of Saint-Martin-en-Coailleux and Saint-Chamond adjoined intimately before merging on 14 March 1964 to form the "greater" Saint-Chamond.) The idea was to use these looms to make flat laces, like those imported from Germany. But he gave up and thought of going to Germany. He recalled an article in the Journal des Débats - which on 15 July 1805 became the Journal de l'Empire- describing the lace industry in the Duchy of Berg. (Note: In Germany, belonging to the Duchy of Berg, lies Krefeld, one of the two towns competing with the Saint-Etienne region for ribbon manufacturing -the other being Basel in Switzerland. It is subject to technical supervision by French manufacturers.) It states that "laces were made on certain looms operated by a single person, and that each loom produced around a hundred ells of laces each day". (Note: The article recounted by Charles-François Richard is probably from the Journal de l'Empire -formerly Journal des débats et des décrets - of 17 January 1806. It states "Duchy of Berg [...] In Elverfeld, 150 silk [looms] are at work [...]: a lace-making machine produces a thousand aunes per hour)

Since May 1802, the Musée des Arts et Métiers has been open to the public. (Note: The Conservatoire des arts et métiers was created by the law of 22 prairial an VI (10 June 1798). Machines that seemed worthy of interest were grouped together and exhibited in a single location.) Demonstrators explain how the many machines on display work. In January 1807, Richard-Chambovet went to Paris and asked Joseph de Montgolfier, a native of Vidalon-lès-Annonay - only 10 km from his birthplace - and demonstrator, (Note: Demonstrator, i.e. teacher giving practical demonstrations. The director or chief administrator was Claude-Pierre Molard) if there were any lace looms on deposit at the Conservatoire. His son led him into a room. Among the looms on display, he noticed one made of wood with thirteen spindles, one of whose characteristics was that it stopped as soon as a thread broke: it was most likely that of Jean-Éléonor Perrault. (Note: Perrault's first name is deduced from the 1837 "Notice sur l'arrondissement de Lisieux", which classifies him as a merchant-worker - i.e., a "cotton spinner" as distinct from a "cotton lace maker" - in Mesnil-Guillaume and from the article "Les moulins de l'Orbiquet", which mentions the authorization granted to Jean-Éléonor Perrault to set up a cotton spinning mill in Mesnil-Guillaume in 1813.) (Note: Louis-Joseph Gras believes that Perrault was more active in Laigle (Orne) than in Lisieux (Calvados). Both locations are correct, according to Jean-Éléonor Perrault, who contributed to a "Notice sur l'arrondissement de Lisieux" in 1837. He wrote: "M. François-Michel Perrault, from Naufle, near Laigle, was the first to import lace looms into France. These looms were made of iron and came from Germany. His son, M. Jean-Éléonor Perrault, a merchant in Lisieux, invented the wooden looms used today. He registered the model at the Musée des Arts et Métiers in Paris.) (Note: On 7 February 1784 letters patent were granted to Perrault for his wooden loom, built by improving a German iron model. It was officially deposited at the Hôtel de Mortagne in 1785, before moving to the Musée des Arts et Métiers.) Upon inquiry, Joseph de Montgolfier indicated that, for Paris, three examples had been built from fir planks to occupy the children of a charity organization. Since they never made a profit, they were sold to a reseller, who can be contacted to purchase them. Richard-Chambovet tracked down this secondhand dealer, bought his three examples for 390 francs (ten francs a spindle), and acquired a hand-operated merry-go-round. Transport to Saint-Chamond and installation cost him 200 francs. Later, he recalled these 600 francs alone to launch the lace factory in Saint-Chamond.

==== Improving Perrault's craft ====
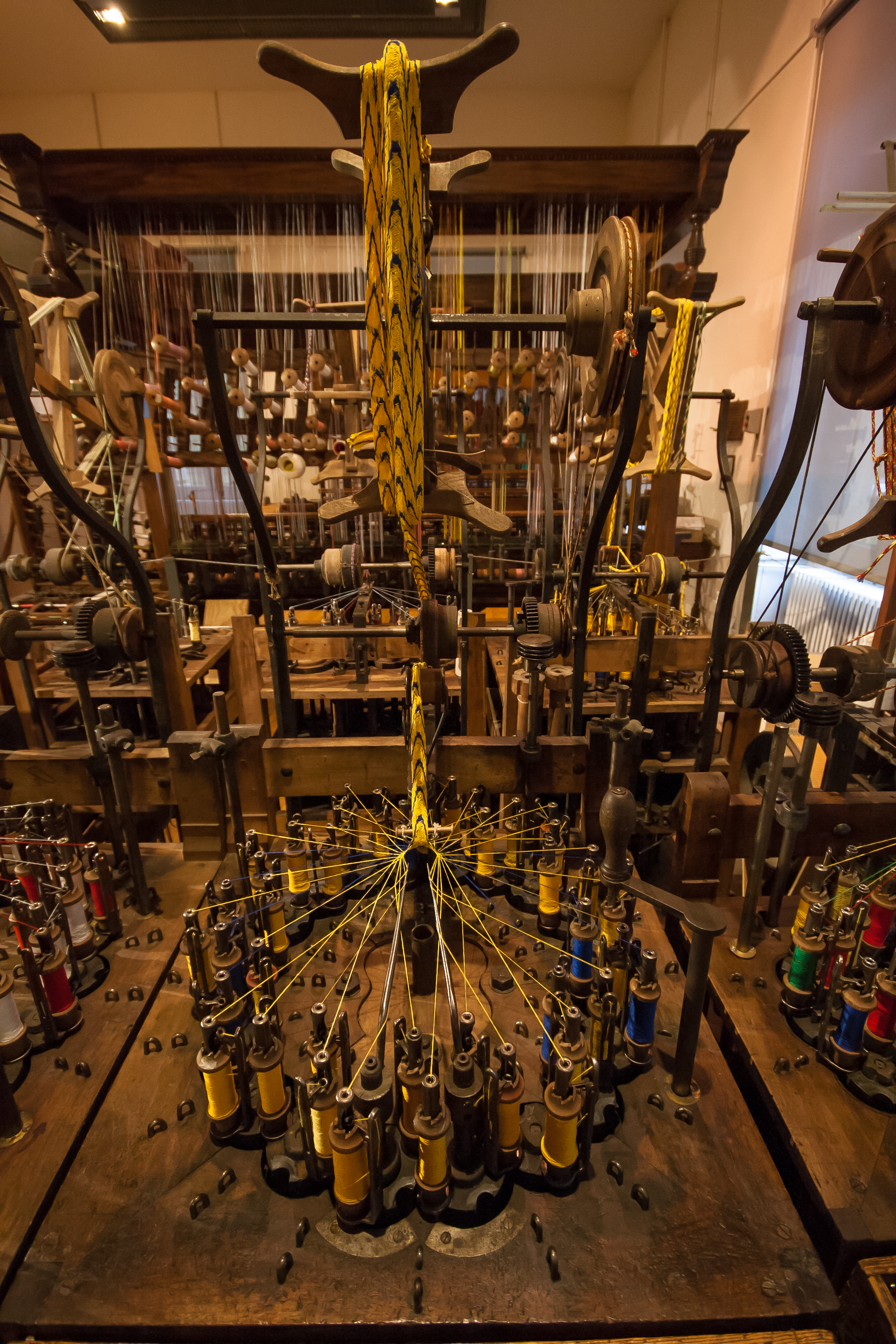
Lace-making on a Perrault loom in 2002.

Richard-Chambovet studied and improved the mechanism of the Perrault loom, which he installed in the Terrasson mill (now rue du Béal in Saint-Chamond). (Note: Another source states: "Near the Saint-Pierre mills")

He orders the manufacture of other looms. A manufacturer from Paris, James Collier, whose prices were too high, was rejected in favor of Jean-Éléonor Perrault. According to Richard-Chambovet, before the business closed, this family was a shoelace manufacturer based in Lisieux (Calvados). These orders were probably filled by the inventor of the basic model.

In Saint-Chamond, "he [initially] experienced great difficulties in selling his products"; in 1808, seven other looms were added to the first ones, then ten more in 1809. He acquired the Granjon factory (place Saint-Jean in Saint-Chamond) to install thirty-nine new looms in 1810, (Note: Another source indicates that he set up "thirty-seven other looms in half the Montagnier factory, whose premises he had just rented on Place Saint-Jean".) then twenty-five more in 1811. These looms cost him a total of twenty-one thousand francs.

This was to create emulators and, in 1813, the first competing company arose: that of M. Hervier-Charrin et Cie. Then Mr. Motiron, an employee of Richard-Chambovet, set up a second factory, and Mr. Tamet, a bookkeeper with Mr. Hervier, created a third. According to an 1812 inventory by Philippe Hedde, there were one hundred and ten looms in Saint-Chamond, eighty-two of which belonged to Richard-Chambovet alone.

==== Steam engine ====
In 1813, Richard-Chambovet acquired the gardens of the former Dutreyve dye works in La Vignette, which included a waterfall, for twenty thousand francs. He installed seventy new trades there, but the fickle flow of water limited his expansion.

To remedy periods of frost and drought, Richard-Chambovet had Mr. Crépu build the first steam engine in the Loire department in Lyon that was not intended for a mine. (Note: The first and few machines installed for mining were of English origin. The one at Richard-Chambovet was built in Lyon by an English prisoner in the service of Mr Crépu, a mechanic.) The Almanach du commerce de Paris points out that, at the time, "it was the first steam engine in France without a condenser". This high-pressure steam engine, whose boiler was chosen by its sponsor from sheet metal rather than cast iron, developed twelve horsepower. (Note: According to Alphonse Peyret, this machine is rated at six horsepower.) Richard-Chambovet justifies it as follows: "This driving force is more expensive, it's true, than a waterfall; but the extra expense is well offset by the regularity of the movement, which is not interrupted by seasonal variations". According to one of his handwritten notes, the machine was set in motion in 1816, although the prefectoral authorization to establish it was formally obtained on 3 March 1817. This machine was able to drive "two hundred and forty lace looms, offering a resistance of one thousand two hundred kilograms, covering sixty meters per minute".

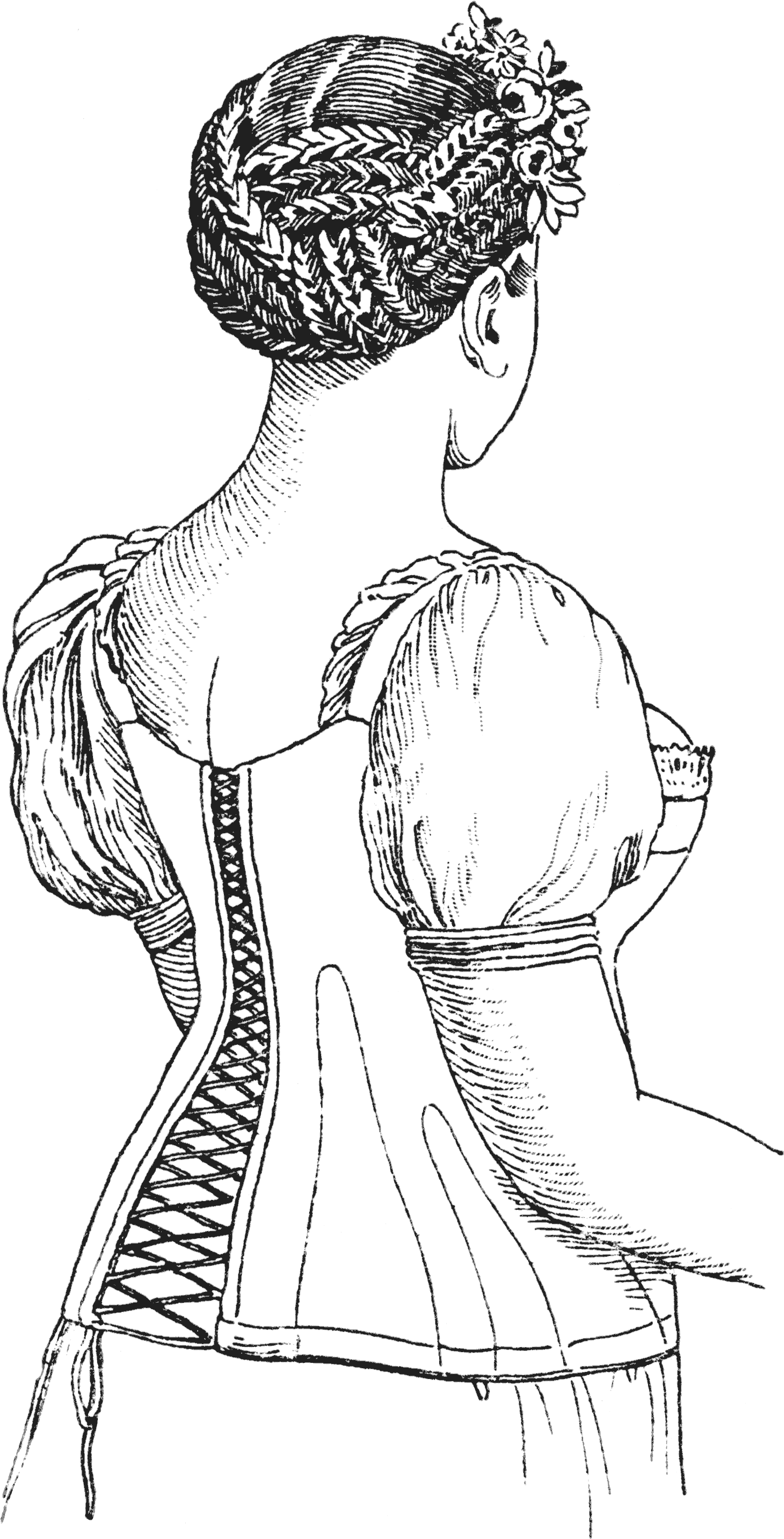
Corset à la Nina (Note: Auguste Thurner wrote in 1885: "Indescribable enthusiasm greeted Nina; fashion took hold of the poor madwoman's name: there were Nina hairstyles, Nina coats, etc. It was delirium, a frenzy.) with back lacing. 1810.

Richard-Chambovet spent 150,000 francs at La Vignette to install 300 looms.

Then, in 1819, he bought the Izieux mills from his loom manufacturer Perrault. These mills, which benefited from all the waters of the Gier and a ten-meter waterfall, enabled him to set up a large factory. He spent 300,000 francs on the installation. In 1828, a new sixteen-horsepower steam engine, built by M. Imbert, a mechanic from Rive-de-Gier, was installed.

Richard-Chambovet's business had grown considerably: "all the looms are made in his workshops; the raw material undergoes all the preparations without leaving his premises. Cotton is spun, milled, bleached, dyed, laced, calendered and folded. (Note: The cotton is passed through a "machine used for pressing".) The same applies to silks and foils.

This opened the way first to four competitors, then in 1822 to one of his employees setting up on his own, and in 1824 to eight entrepreneurs. Statistics covering the towns of Saint-Étienne and Saint-Chamond show that in 1824, there were 2,200 trades, 800 of which belonged to Richard-Chambovet. He alone employed 300 workers. Among the most notable technical features were the fact that the looms were independent of each other, and could be stopped individually if a thread broke, and that production could be increased by a third by working at night. The total value of raw materials consumed annually was 1,100,000 francs and doubled once all stages of production had been completed.

At the time, this expansion in shoelace manufacture was because, according to a technological dictionary of the time, "it is a haberdashery item of fairly wide consumption. Women used silk laces to fasten their corsets and other garments. Linen, hemp, and cotton thread laces are used for the same purpose, but they are also used, instead of string, for ligatures".

In 1830, Philippe Hedde noted that "the competition that has arisen between the various factories of Saint-Étienne and Saint-Chamond has reduced the sale of laces to the smallest profit, but this has resulted in a great advantage for export, to the detriment of factories in Germany, which can no longer compete on price. Saint-Chamond and Saint-Étienne supply Amsterdam, Brussels, Leipzig, Antwerp, Milan, a few cantons in Switzerland and the two Americas. After detailing the performance of the Richard-Chambovet factory, he continues: "No foreign competition is to be feared today for a factory that has succeeded in bringing order and economy in its workforce to such a degree of perfection".

==== Calorifier ====
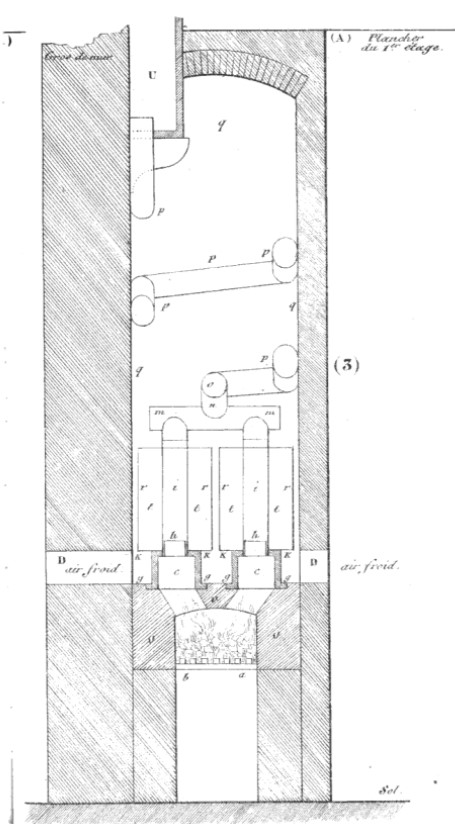
Richard. Calorifier with six beehives.jpg

Richard-Chambovet and his son Ennemond Richard joined forces after a year's stay in England. They operated under the name of MM. Richard-Chambovet et compagnie.

In 1830, they perfected cast-iron milling machines acquired in England. Output was further increased: spindles were increased from 1,000 to 3,000 revolutions per minute while requiring less motive power.

In 1831, the characteristics of innovative calorifiers installed at the Izieux plant were reported. A "six-beehive calorifier", fuelled by coal, replaced six stoves very economically. The even heat prevents the oil from freezing on the looms far from the stoves. The elimination of draughts puts an end to unpleasant odors from the stoves, oils, and gut ropes used to power the looms. The fumes that discolored the silks disappeared. The worker's hands, which no longer have to maintain the stoves, are no longer blackened or chapped by washing; they can handle the silk fabrics without loss. The general temperature is ten degrees Réaumur (or 12.5 degrees Celsius), but is modulated in each workshop to best preserve the silk. The rapporteur points out that this calorifier can also be installed in any building under construction: hospitals, collective or individual housing, etc. It's easy to downsize, as in the Izieux plant, which also has a two-fire calorifier.

==== Gas lighting ====
In 1833, gas lighting was installed at the Izieux factory, well before Saint-Étienne and Lyon were equipped. In 1836, "two hundred and sixteen nozzles were in operation, enabling workers to work day and night, with replacements at midday and midnight".

In 1833, along with the looms already in use, the factory produced "round elastic laces" for the first time in the Saint-Étienne district, with each rubber thread covered in silk or thread, followed by "flat elastic laces" of variable width.

In 1833, the company was still as active as ever, as evidenced by the filing of two patents: one "for the improvement brought to lace looms and its application to the manufacture of cannetilles", (Note: A cannetille is a "small, very fine, twisted blade of gold or silver".) and the other for "improvements to lace looms".

In 1835, the price of a kilogram of cotton laces was only eight francs and fifty centimes, three times less than ten years earlier.

This industrialization led to the following statement: "The lace industry only developed under the Empire, in Saint-Chamond, which acquired a virtual monopoly". The industry's influence is cited as an example: "Manufacturers in Saint-Chamond established vast networks that went far beyond the national framework, reaching out to continental horizons and, in some cases, even worldwide".

== Circumstances ==
Chinese lace loom reproduced by Isidore Hedde in 1843-1846.

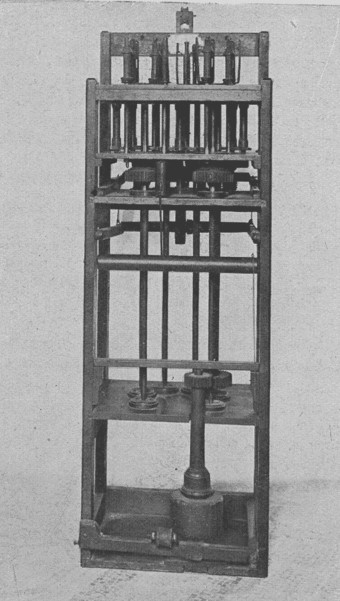
Perrault's lace loom preserved at the Musée des Arts et Métiers in 1933.

Charles-François Richard evolved at the start of the Industrial Revolution, and his stubbornness and innovative spirit made him a key player. He supported the idea that "great men are conditioned by general circumstances [...] They can only act by the exceptional firmness of their character".

He is at the origin of Europe's primacy in the lace industry. Certainly, when Isidore Hedde, a contemporary, visited the "Celestial Empire" from 1843 to 1846, he asserted that "the Chinese were making laces, cordonnets, galloons, ganses, padoux, etc. long before the Europeans did". However, as in other fields, they did not pass on this know-how. This enabled historian and economist Jean-Charles Asselain to assert in the 20th century that "Song China (960-1279) was undeniably richer than the Europe of its time. [...] However, the result was never a cumulative process comparable to that of the industrial revolution, and the momentum had already largely subsided when China closed itself off from relations with the outside world in the 15th century".

It wasn't until the start of the Industrial Revolution that Richard, and thus Europe, produced lace looms, developing a patent by the Englishman Thomas Walford in 1748, albeit with incomplete indications. In 1750, probably inspired by the English patent, a braiding loom was developed in Germany by Bockmühl, at Barmen in the Wupper valley. After further refinements, the shuttle stops when a thread breaks; this loom is driven by hydraulic power. However, the efficiency of this type of machine was inadequate due to its design. In 1783, François-Michel Perrault imported an iron model to France from Elberfeld -about 5 km from Barmen- still in the Duchy of Berg. Then his son, Jean-Éléonor, submitted an improved wooden model to Jean-François de Tolozan's office, for which he obtained a privilege in 1784. This is most likely the loom that attracted Charles-François Richard's attention. On the one hand, the characteristics of the loom observed at the Musée des arts et métiers and those built by Jean-Éléonor Perrault make the builder also its inventor. On the other hand, the similarity of the prices with those later charged to Richard-Chambovet for loom construction makes the same. However, the Richard family never specifies this link. A known enmity had developed between the family and Perrault fils. In 1942, this loom is still referenced in the latest series of Conservatoire catalogs, which testifies to its importance. Thus Charles-François Richard "created a hitherto unknown industry by importing the mechanically operated spindle loom and gradually increasing its tooling and manufacture".

== Bibliography ==
=== Primary sources ===
- P. (1824). "Fabrique de lacets". Bulletin d'industrie agricole et manufacturière. Vol. 2. Société d’agriculture, arts et commerce de l’arrondissement de Saint-Étienne (Loire). pp. 27–29. ISSN 1256-3129.
- De la Tour-Varan, Jean-Antoine; Richard, Ennemond (1851). "Fabrication des lacets". Bulletin. Notice statistique industrielle sur la ville de Saint-Étienne et son arrondissement. Vol. XXI. Société industrielle et agricole de Saint-Étienne. pp. 73–75. ISSN 1256-3129.

=== Secondary sources ===
- Hedde, Philippe (1830). "Fabrication des lacets". Indicateur du commerce, des arts et des manufactures de Saint-Étienne, Saint-Chamond et Rive-de-Gier, précédé d'un aperçu sur l'industrie de l'arrondissement de Saint-Étienne. pp. 56–57.
- Thiollier, Lucien Auguste (1894). Notices industrielles : La chambre de commerce de Saint-Étienne, bustes et portraits. Vingt-trois héliogravures de Félix Thiollier, faites d'après les originaux des peintures et sculptures appartenant à la chambre de commerce, œuvres de Hippolyte Flandrin, Albert Maignan, Guillaume Montagny, etc. pp. 18–23.
- Gras, Louis-Joseph (1906). "Histoire de la rubanerie et des industries de la soie à Saint-Étienne et dans la région stéphanoise : suivie d'un historique de la fabrique de lacets de Saint-Chamond; étude sur le régime économique et la situation générale depuis les origines jusqu'à nos jours". LSociété de l'imprimerie Théolier.

== See also ==
- Saint-Chamond, Loire
- Shoelaces
