= Deubré =

Ornamental shoelace tag

Dubraé
- Type: Shoelace
- Inventor: Damon Clegg
- Inception: 1994; 32 years ago
- Manufacturer: Nike, Inc.

Dubraé is a generic term, originating at Nike, Inc. and dating from the mid 1990s, for an ornamental shoelace tag, most commonly seen on sneakers. Typically, a dubraé will have two holes through which a shoelace is threaded, like a bead on string. When the shoe is laced, the dubraé is centered between the first two eyelets (closest to the toe), with the shoelace passing through and behind the dubraé.

A dubraé is typically made of metal, plastic, or leather, and may often be decorated with text or a commercial logo. It is distinguished from a bead in that it is non-tubular; it has two points of entry/exit for the shoelace, as a belt or webbing may pass through a buckle. Although primarily decorative in purpose, one could argue a dubraé is also functional in that once threaded to the midpoint of a shoelace, it assists in centering the shoelace in the shoe, although few dubraé and shoelace combinations will necessarily provide enough friction to hold the dubraé in place while lacing.

== Overview ==
The term 'dubraé' originated with a Nike footwear designer, Damon Clegg. In a 1994 product presentation for an internal group, Clegg pointed out features of his design for a Nike ACG boot, eventually coming to the shoelace tag, for which he lacked a term. Falling back on a word he had originally picked up from his Glasgow-native college roommate, he called it a "doobrie"—a British placeholder name, akin to "watchamacallit" or "thingy." (British media personality Kenny Everett had often used the word "doobrie" in this manner during the 1980s.) Although Clegg suspected his audience had mistaken the word for a specific technical term, he continued his presentation.

The term became popular within Nike and passed into wider use through the company's marketing literature. Nike documents reflect later uses of the word on designers' sketches and computer files with the Clegg spelling. However, over time, the pronunciation evolved to the Americanised doo-bray, whilst spellings would come to vary widely from "doobray" to "dubret" and "deubré". The doo-bray pronunciation has become commonplace among sneaker collectors, with wide disagreement as to its spelling. With the publication of a catalog for the Nike Air Force 1 in 2006, Nike came to embrace the spelling "dubraé". However, it is suggested that this highly Frenchified spelling was simply a marketing approach by Nike to provide the item with a veneer of fashionable sophistication.

== Popular versions ==
A dubraé may be used on a dress shoe or sneakers. It may vary in shape, size, material or materials, graphics, and text. The Nike Air Force 1, originally designed in 1982 by Bruce Kilgore, has been embellished with a dubraé since the late 1990s. Considering the popularity of this shoe, its dubraé is likely the most widely produced in history.
