= Hôtel de Ville, Saint-Chamond =

Town hall in Saint-Chamond, Loire, France

Hôtel de Ville
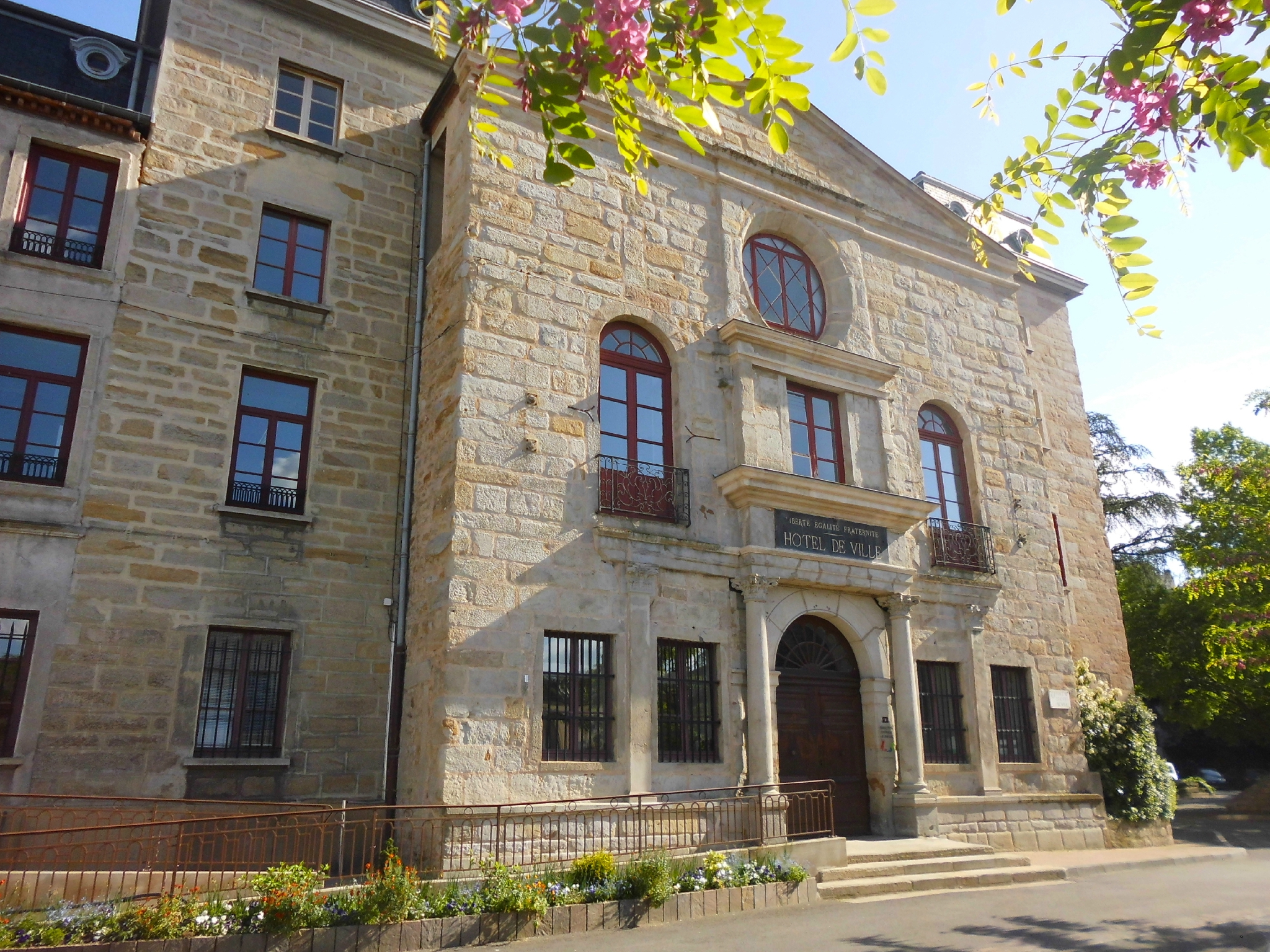
- The main frontage of the Hôtel de Ville in May 2015

General information
- Type: City hall
- Architectural style: Neoclassical style
- Location: Saint-Chamond, France
- Coordinates: 45.4764°N 4.5126°E
- Completed: 1624

Monument historique
- Official name: Chapelle des Minimes (ancienne)
- Type: Inscrit
- Designated: 1965
- Reference no.: PA00117589

The Hôtel de Ville (French pronunciation: [otɛl də vil], City Hall), formerly the Couvent des Minimes (Convent of the Minimes), is a municipal building in Saint-Chamond, Loire, in central France, standing on Place de l'Hôtel de Ville. The oldest part of the building is a chapel which was designated a monument historique by the French government in 1965.

== History ==
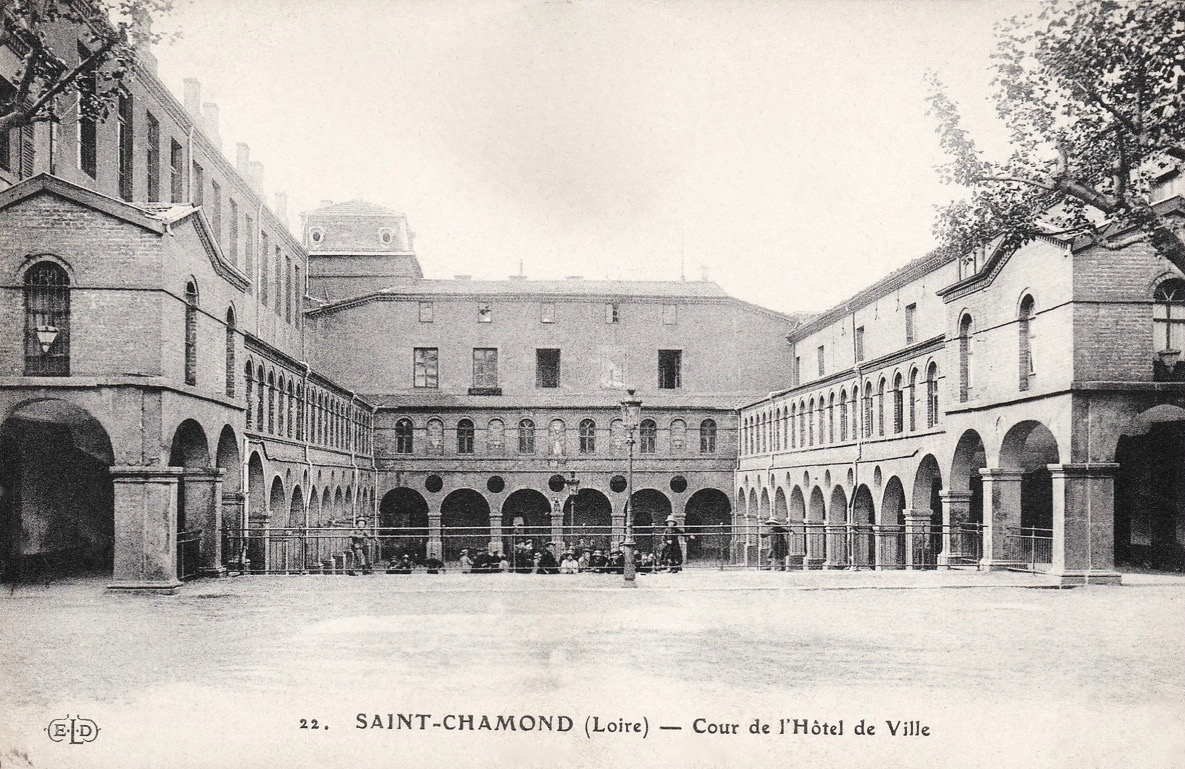
The cloisters at the centre of the building in the early 20th century

The building was commissioned by Gabrielle de Gadagne, who was the wife of Jacques Mitte de Chevrières Miolans, Seigneur of Saint-Chamond, as the Couvent des Minimes (Convent of the Minimes). De Gadagne was of Italian descent, her ancestors being the Guadagni family who lived in Florence, Italy until they were forced into exile in the 15th century. The foundation stone of the convent was laid on 19 April 1622. The convent was designed in the neoclassical style, built in ashlar stone and was completed on 31 May 1624.

The building was laid out around cloisters with a chapel on the west side. The original design of the chapel, which was rebuilt in 1633, involved a symmetrical main frontage of just three bays facing north onto what is now Place de l'Hôtel de Ville. The central bay, which, was projected forward, featured a round ended opening with voussoirs on the ground floor and a square headed casement window on the first floor. The outer bays were fenestrated by pairs of casement windows with grills on the ground floor and by round headed windows on the first floor. The main frontage was surmounted by a pediment and there was a tower on the east side of the chapel.

Following the French Revolution, the convent was seized by the state and the monks were driven out. The former convent was then acquired by the town council, who constructed a new wing on the east side of the cloisters in 1807. The new east wing was used for municipal purposes to accommodate the local police and the justice of the peace and it was extended to the rear in 1825. The fire service moved into a dedicated fire station to the north east of the main building in 1830.

By the mid-19th century, the complex had become quite dilapidated, and the council decided to relocate to alternative premises. In 1861, after the council had left, the complex was taken over by the Pères Maristes (Marist Fathers) who established a school there. Meanwhile, the council occupied a building on Rue de l'Hôtel de Ville and then relocated to another building at No. 77 Rue de la République in 1865. After the Marist fathers moved out in 1879, the council led by the mayor, Marius Chavanne, decided to return to the former convent and commissioned an extensive programme of works to convert the building into a proper town hall. The works, undertaken to a design by Sieur Leroux, involved the creation of a new Salle du Conseil (council chamber) with a coffered ceiling and fine wood panelling. A large park, the Jardin des Plantes (now Parc Nelson Mandela), was also created to the south of the building at that time.

A major programme of works was completed to a design by Aimé Malécot between 1936 and 1938: the works involved inserting a pedestrian passageway into the centre of the north block, to provide access to the cloisters, and the creation of a new façade on the west side, to the south of the chapel, to provide access to the public areas of the complex. A new community hall, known as the Salle Condorcet, was established in the west block in 1949. Following a significant increase in population, the council needed more office space and a school, the Lycée Claude-Lebois, which had occupied part of the east wing since 1879, relocated to Boulevard Alamagny in September 1961.

A new assembly hall, the Salle des Fêtes Aristide Briand, was built to the east of the main complex and was officially opened by the president of France, François Mitterrand, in 1988. The television presenter, Bernard Pivot, hosted a ceremony to celebrate the 100th birthday of the former prime minister, Antoine Pinay, in the Salle des Fêtes Aristide Briand in 1992.
