= Saint-Chamond, Loire =

Saint-Chamond
- Commune
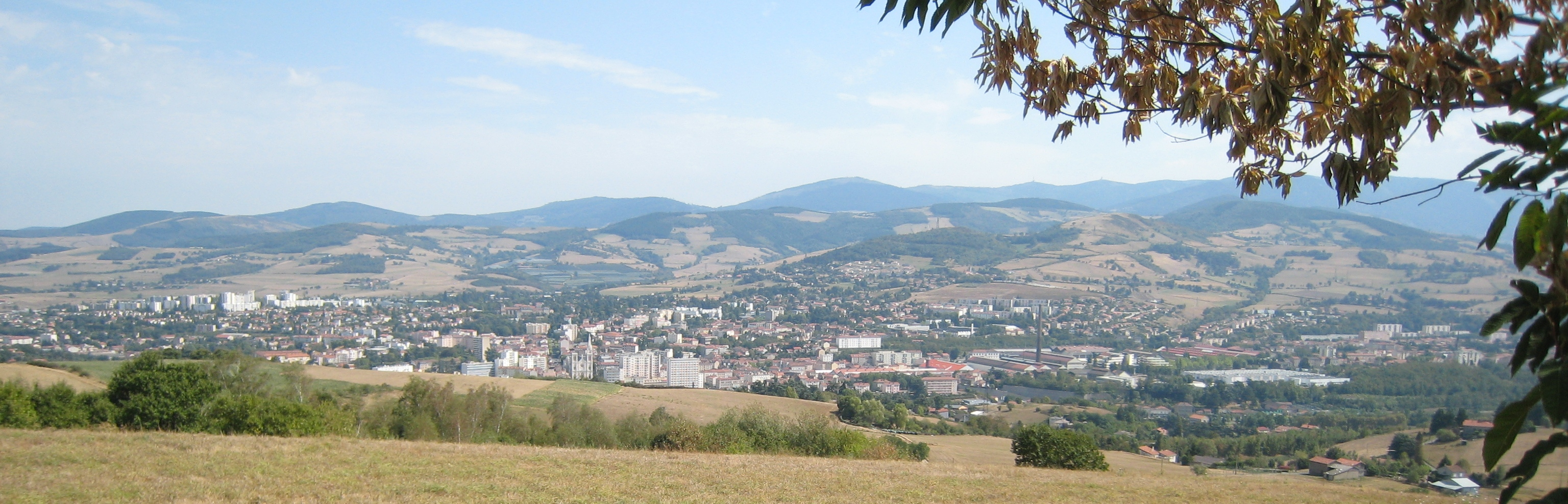

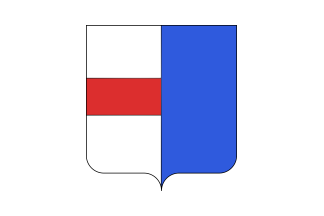
- Flag Coat of arms
- Location of Saint-Chamond
- Location within France Location within Auvergne-Rhône-Alpes
- Coordinates: 45°28′39″N 4°30′55″E
- Country: France
- Region: Auvergne-Rhône-Alpes
- Department: Loire
- Arrondissement: Saint-Étienne
- Canton: Saint-Chamond
- Intercommunality: Saint-Étienne Métropole

Government
  - Mayor (2023–2026): Axel Dugua
- Area^{1}: 54.88 km^{2} (21.19 sq mi)
- Elevation: 375 m (1,230 ft)
- Highest elevation: 1,051 m (3,448 ft)
- Lowest elevation: 326 m (1,070 ft)
- Population (2023): 35,646
  - Density: 649.5/km^{2} (1,682/sq mi)
- Time zone: UTC+01:00 (CET)
  - Summer (DST): UTC+02:00 (CEST)
- INSEE/Postal code: 42207 /42400
- ^{1} French Land Register data, which excludes lakes, ponds, glaciers > 1 km^{2} (0.386 sq mi or 247 acres) and river estuaries.

Saint-Chamond (French pronunciation: [sɛ̃ ʃamɔ̃]) is a commune in the Loire department in the Auvergne-Rhône-Alpes region in central France. Situated 13 km northeast of the city of Saint-Étienne and 46 km southwest of Lyon, the town dates back to the Roman period.

It lies in an iron and coal region, which were the basis of industrial growth during the 19th and 20th centuries. As many of the mines and factories closed in the late 20th century due to restructuring, there was a loss of jobs and population.

The present city of Saint-Chamond is the result of the merger in 1964 of the communes of Saint-Martin-en-Coailleux, Saint-Julien-en-Jarez, Izieux and Saint-Chamond. The new town is the third-largest town in the department.

== Location ==
Saint-Chamond is located in the Gier valley between the Monts du Lyonnais to the north and Mont Pilat to the south. The peak of Perdrix, at 1,434 metres (4,705 ft) is the highest in the Pilat massif. The "Saut du Gier" waterfall is in the Pilat Regional Natural Park. The peak of Œillon provides views of the Rhone valley, and sometimes of the Mont-Blanc massif.

The city developed on both sides of the Gier River, the source of which is on Mont Pilat. The river flows east down the Gier valley for 44 kilometres (27 mi) before entering the Rhone at Givors. The river was covered over within the city.

Saint-Chamond is named after Saint Annemund, a seventh-century saint.

== Geography and communities ==
Saint-Étienne lies 13 kilometres (8.1 mi) to the west and Lyon about 46 kilometres (29 mi) to the east. Surrounding towns are Saint-Étienne, Lorette, La Grand-Croix, L'Horme, Cellieu and Saint-Jean-Bonnefonds. Saint-Chamond is divided into several districts:

- Fonsala, the largest district
- Izieux
- Le Creux
- Lavieu
- Saint-Ennemond
- Saint-Julien-en-Jarez
- Saint-Pierre
- Chavanne
- Les Palermes
- La Chabure
- Clos Marquet
- La Varizelle
- La Valette
- Saint-Martin-en-Coailleux
- Saint-Chamond centre.

The town lies on the A47 highway between Lyon and Saint-Étienne. A second highway, the A45, is planned through the hamlet of Chavanne. One railway station serves the town. Various bus lines also provide local transport.

== History ==
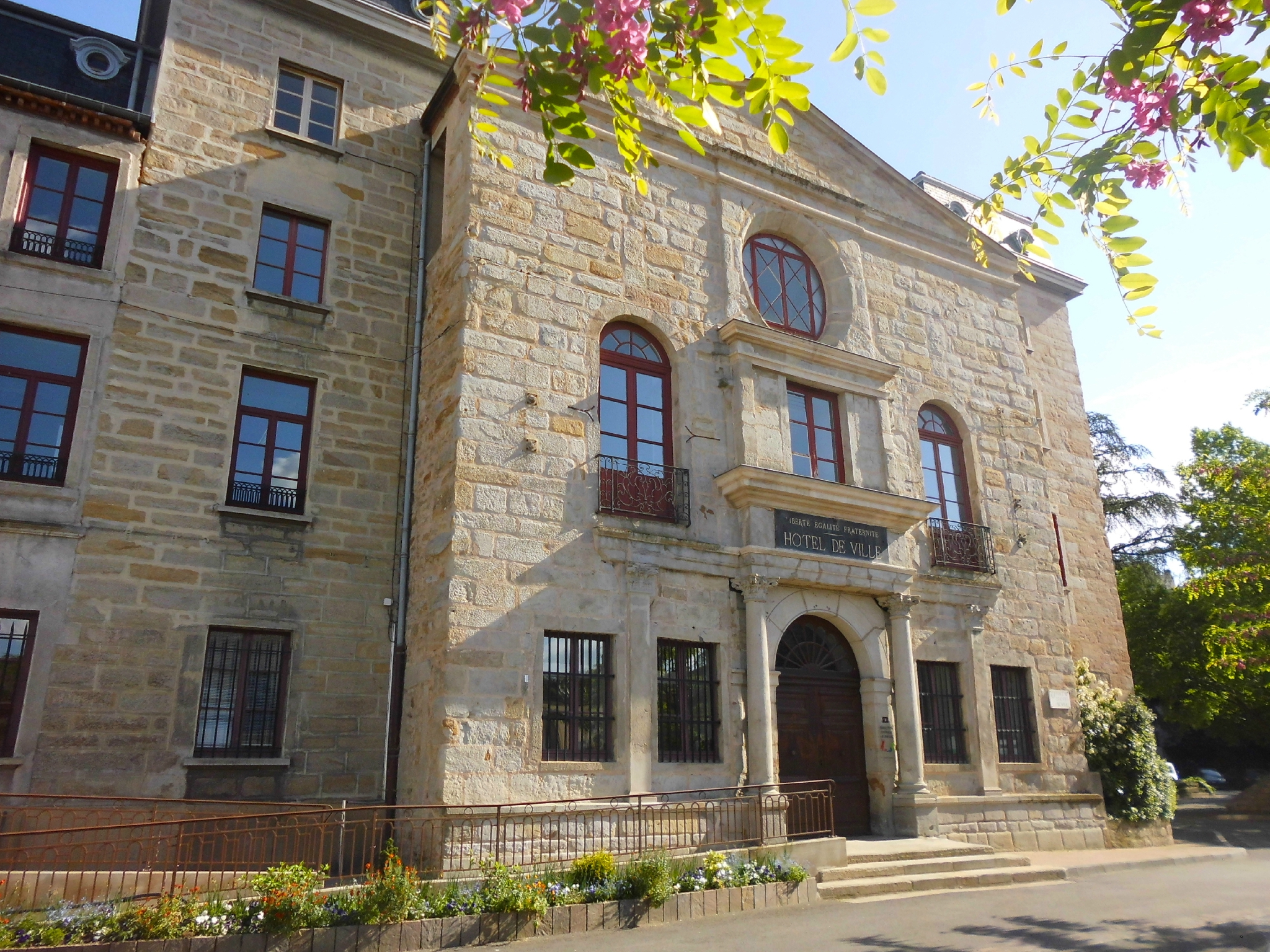
The Hôtel de Ville

Saint-Chamond was originally a fort guarding one of five aqueducts that supplied the Roman city of Lugdunum (Lyon). The Gier aqueduct carried the waters of the river Gier captured upstream of Saint-Chamond. During the later Middle Ages, Saint-Chamond was a very important manor in the region and served as the capital of Jarez. Melchior Mitte de Chevrières, lord of Saint-Chamond, laid out the town.

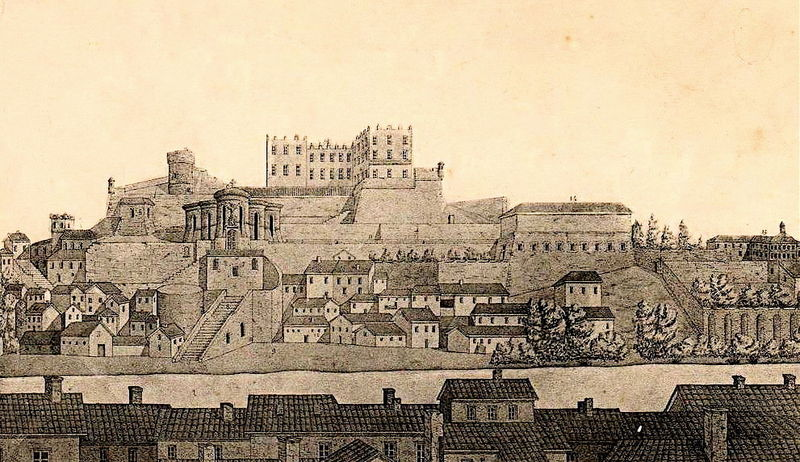
Saint-Chamond 1664.

A number of older buildings survive, including House of Canons of the 15th and 16th sixteenth centuries (listed building), Hôtel-Dieu (historical monument); St. Peter's church from the 17th century, with 19th-century organs by Claude-Ignace Callinet (historical monument); and the 17th-century convent of the Minimes, now the Hôtel de Ville (town hall) of Saint-Chamond.

During the French Revolution, the castle of Saint-Chamond was destroyed by the peasants in 1792. Only the stables are still visible on the hill of Saint-Ennemond. During the revolution the name associated with the church was changed. The town was briefly called Vallée-Rousseau after the philosopher Jean-Jacques Rousseau.

In 1793 the city of Lyon revolted against the Convention and was joined by Saint-Chamond. The governmental forces defeated the Lyonnaise army, leading to the evacuation of Saint-Chamond. The Convention sent Claude Javogues to the city, who imposed fines and summary executions to suppress unrest. In 1796 the town sent a mobile column against refractory priests and deserters.

== Population ==
Saint-Chamond is the largest town in the Vallée du Gier metropolitan area and the third-largest population center in the Loire department, after Saint-Étienne and Roanne. In 1800 the town had about 5,000 inhabitants. With development of the coal and iron industries, the population rose steadily, peaking at more than 40,000 in 1982. Since then, many factories have closedl, and the population has decreased. The population data in the table and graph below refer to the commune of Saint-Chamond proper, in its geography at the given years. The commune of Saint-Chamond absorbed the former communes of Izieux, Saint-Julien-en-Jarez and Saint-Martin-en-Coailleux in 1964.

Historical population

Year	Pop.	±% p.a.
1793	5,416	—
1800	4,977	−1.20%
1806	5,800	+2.58%
1821	5,988	+0.21%
1831	7,475	+2.24%
1836	9,001	+3.79%
1841	8,204	−1.84%
1846	8,406	+0.49%
1851	8,897	+1.14%
1856	10,472	+3.31%
1861	11,626	+2.11%
1866	12,652	+1.71%
1872	12,585	−0.09%
1876	14,420	+3.46%
1881	14,149	−0.38%
1886	14,383	+0.33%
1891	14,963	+0.79%
1896	14,463	−0.68%
1901	15,469	+1.35%

Year	Pop.	±% p.a.
1906	14,430	−1.38%
1911	14,897	+0.64%
1921	15,885	+0.64%
1926	15,468	−0.53%
1931	14,842	−0.82%
1936	14,711	−0.18%
1946	14,820	+0.07%
1954	15,580	+0.63%
1962	17,107	+1.18%
1968	37,728	+14.09%
1975	40,250	+0.93%
1982	40,267	+0.01%
1990	38,878	−0.44%
1999	37,378	−0.44%
2007	35,414	−0.67%
2012	35,564	+0.08%
2017	34,967	−0.34%
2023	35,646	+0.32%

Source: EHESS and INSEE (1968-2023)

== Economy ==
Starting in 1771 the Neyrand brothers had become owners of several coal mines and ironworks in the valley of the Gier river. The community became a center of a region of coal and iron production in the 19th and 20th centuries, stimulating its industrialization and growth. In 1837 H. Pétin and J. M. Gaudet, mechanics and forgers, set up shops at Saint-Chamond and Rive-de-Gier. In 1841 Pétin et Gaudet introduced one of the first steam hammers at their works. Later they introduced innovations such as a mobile crane for moving large pieces around the works, and a hydraulic press.

The company of Neyrand frères et Thiollière was formed in January 1845 to exploit an enlarged and modernized factory at Lorette. These companies merged on 14 November 1854, forming the Compagnie des Hauts-fourneaux, forges et aciéries de la Marine et des chemins de fer. The company, which engaged in extracting, processing and selling iron and coal, was initially based in Rive-de-Gier. On 9 November 1871 it moved its headquarters to Saint-Chamond and became a limited company. The factories were mainly concentrated in the Loire basin, in Saint-Chamond and Assailly.

In 1880 Saint-Chamond was the world capital of the lace industry. This industry was founded by Charles François Richard, assisted by his son Ennemond Richard. Eighteen years later, the Manufactures Réunies company was formed by merging ten of the largest manufacturers of lace.

During World War I (1914-1918) the steel company built several different types of weapons, notably the Saint Chamond-Mondragón 75 mm gun, which had been designed mostly by colonel Rimailho, the Saint-Chamond tank, and the Chauchat machine rifle. They also produced naval guns, such as the quadruple-gun turret design for the unfinished Normandie-class battleships.

Industrial restructuring affected the region in the postwar period, as costs rose for mining. In the 1950s the city's last mine at Clos Marquet was closed. The steelworks became part of the Creusot-Loire group, which had 28 factories and 39,000 employees in the region, including 3,100 in Saint-Chamond.

== Twin towns ==
Saint-Chamond is twinned with:

- Grevenbroich, Germany
- Sant Adrià de Besòs, Spain

== Personalities ==
- Edmond Locard (1877–1966), pioneer of forensic science
- Alain Prost, Formula One world champion
- Nico Prost, racing driver and son Alain Prost
- Ravachol, anarchist

== See also ==
- André César Vermare, sculptor who made the statue of Sadi Carnot in Saint-Chamond.
- Charles-François Richard

== Points of interest ==
- Jardin botanique de Saint-Chamond
