= Jardin botanique de Saint-Chamond =

Botanical garden in Auvergne-Rhône-Alpes, France

Coordinates: 45°28′39″N 4°30′55″E

The Jardin botanique de Saint-Chamond (7,000 m²) is a botanical garden located at 4 chemin du Jardin Botanique, Saint-Chamond, Loire, Auvergne-Rhône-Alpes, France. It is open by appointment.

The garden was created by Michel Manevy on the site of a former peach nursery. It now contains about 4,500 plants arranged into various gardens including English and Japanese gardens, Italian garden, herb garden, a pergola, and a pathway paved as an Aztec calendar.

== See also ==
- List of botanical gardens in France
