= Shoelaces =

Laces or strings for fastening shoes

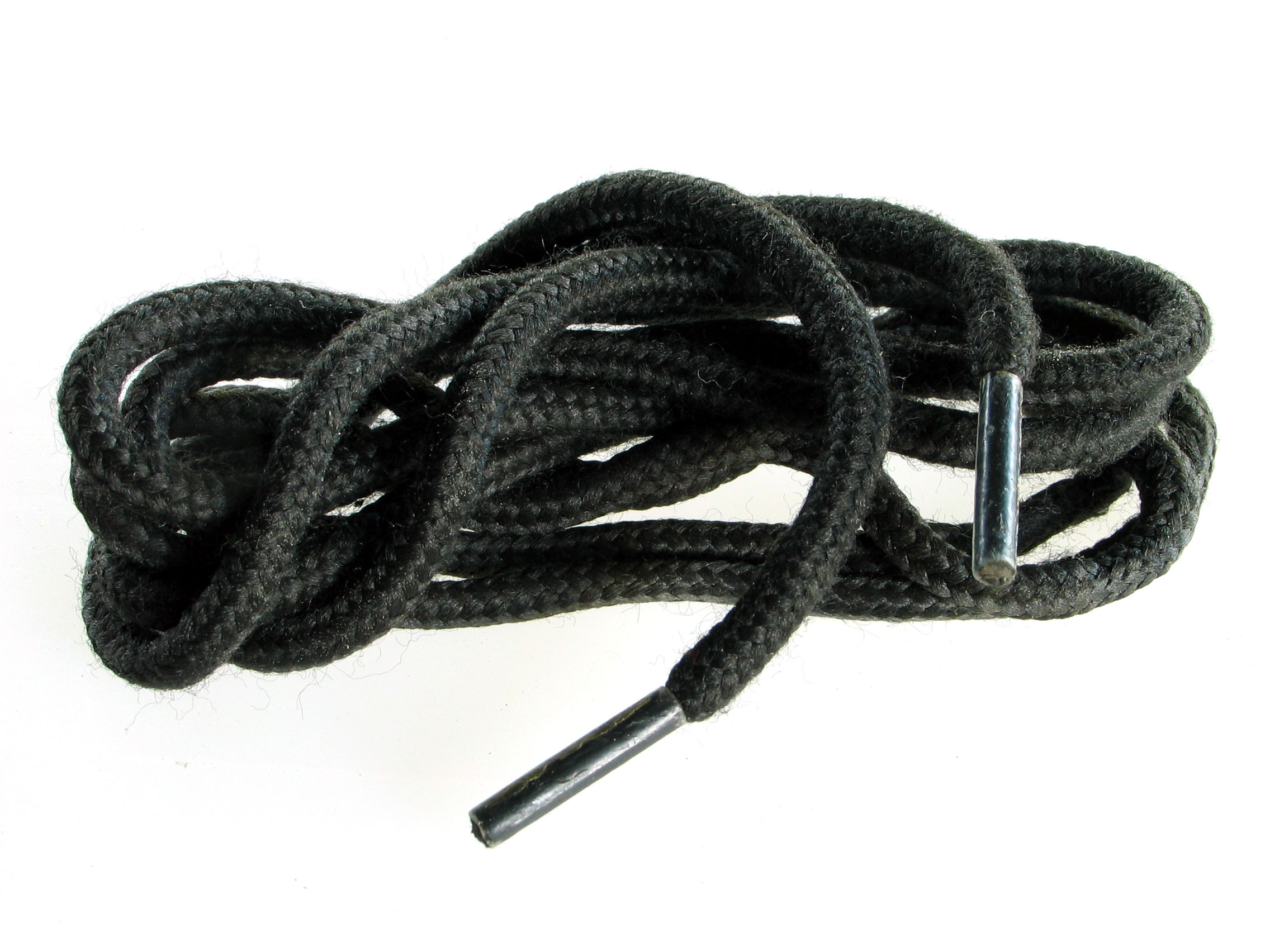
Black shoelace

Shoelaces, also called shoestrings (US English) or bootlaces (UK English), are a system commonly used to secure shoes, boots, and other footwear. They typically consist of a pair of strings or cords, one for each shoe, finished off at both ends with stiff sections, known as aglets. Each shoelace typically passes through a series of holes, eyelets, loops or hooks on either side of the shoe. Loosening the lacing allows the shoe to open wide enough for the foot to be inserted or removed. Tightening the lacing and tying off the ends secures the foot firmly within the shoe. The laces can be tied in different shapes, most commonly a simple bow.

== Shoelace construction ==
Traditional shoelaces were made of leather, cotton, jute, hemp, or other materials used in the manufacture of rope. Modern shoelaces often incorporate various synthetic fibers, which are generally more slippery and thus more prone to coming undone than those made from traditional fibers. On the other hand, smooth synthetic shoelaces generally have a less rough appearance, suffer less wear from friction, and are less susceptible to rotting from moisture. Shoelaces can be coated, either in the factory or with aftermarket products, to increase friction and help them stay tied. Specialized fibers like flame resistant nomex are applied in safety boots for firefighters.

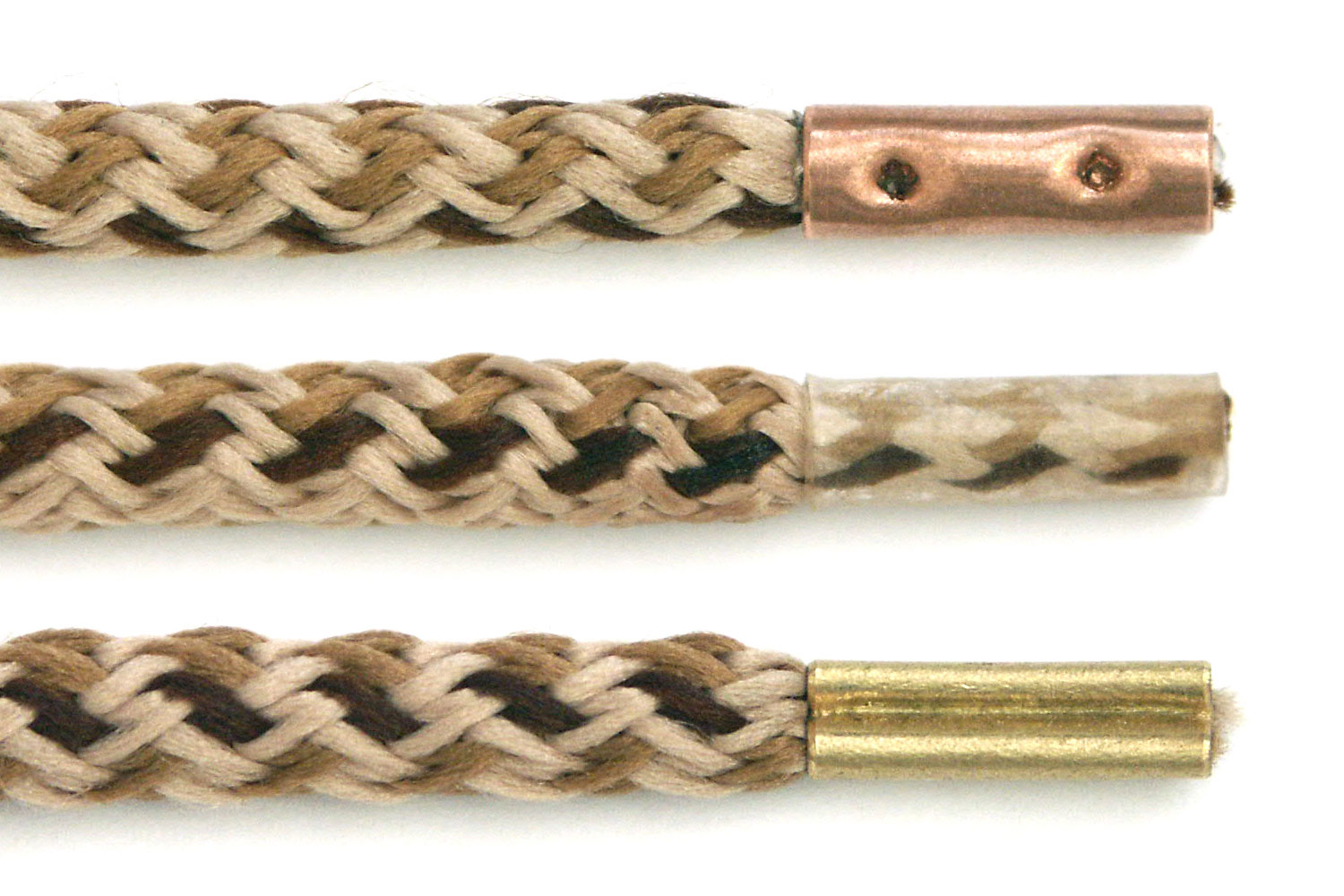
Three shoelaces tipped with three different aglets: copper, plastic, and brass

The stiff section at each end of the shoelace, which both keeps the twine from unraveling and also makes it easier to hold the lace and feed it through the eyelets, is called an aglet, also spelled aiglet.

Shoelaces with a flat cross-section are generally easier to hold and stay tied more securely than those with a round cross-section due to the increased surface area for friction. Very wide flat laces are often called "fat laces". Leather shoelaces with a square cross-section, which are very common on boat shoes, are notoriously prone to coming undone.

=== Elasticized ===
There are also various types of elasticized shoelaces. Elastic laces both make the lacing more comfortable, as well as allowing the shoe to be slipped on and off without tying or untying, which makes them a popular choice for children, the elderly and athletes.

Traditional "elastic" laces look identical to normal laces, and can simply be tied and untied as normal. They may also come with a permanent clip so they can be fastened invisibly. "Knotty" laces have a series of "fat" sections, which restrict movement through eyelets. These can be used to adjust tension throughout the lacing area. These laces can be tied or the ends can be left loose. "Twirly" laces are like a tight elastic helix, which can simply be pulled tight without requiring a knot.

=== Lace-locking systems ===
Various systems have been developed to prevent laces from coming loose, often for athletic training and competition purposes where laces becoming loose or untied could present a hazard. Mechanisms include fastening or locking devices, elasticized laces, or expandable knots within the lace.

== Shoelace tying ==
Basic shoe-tying knot

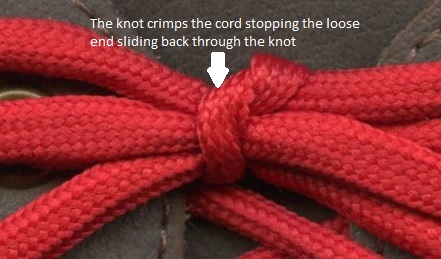
A properly formed knot sufficiently compressing the cord prevents its lace end from passing through

When a shoelace is secured with a knot, the lace is crimped, or squashed. Primarily this is what stops the lace from coming undone. In effect, the lace is narrower inside the knot than it is on the loose end, and the loose end cannot make itself smaller and slide though the knot. Generally, a flat tubular lace will stay tied more easily than a round lace with a core because the flat lace can be more crimped within the knot. Most laces, however, are round and have core of cotton yarn, especially boot laces. For these to stay tied securely, the core on the inside of the lace must be soft and compressible. A secondary factor of laces coming undone is the knot itself slipping. This is due to a lack of friction. Cotton laces have a rough surface and will make a more reliable knot compared to polyester (the most common yarn used in shoelaces). In addition, a lace can be smooth or have a coarse surface, which will also affect performance. Finishing processes are available, including waxing and silicone treatments, which enhance friction and stop knot slippage. These are important design factors in the manufacture of hiking-boot laces.

=== Common bow ===
Shoelaces are typically tied off at the top of the shoe using a simple bow knot. Besides securing the shoe, this also takes up the length of shoelace exposed after tightening. The common bow consists of two half-knots tied one on top of the other, with the second half-knot looped in order to allow quick untying. When required, the knot can be readily loosened by pulling one or both of the loose ends.

When tying the half-knots, a right-over-left half-knot followed by a left-over-right half-knot (or vice versa) forms a square or reef knot, a fairly effective knot for the purpose of tying shoelaces. However, tying two consecutive right-over-left half-knots (or two consecutive left-over-right half-knots) forms the infamous granny knot, which is much less secure. Most people who use it will find themselves regularly retying their shoelaces.

If the loops lie across the shoe (left to right), the knot is probably a square knot. If they lie along the shoe (heel to toe), the knot is probably a granny knot.

=== Other more secure knots ===
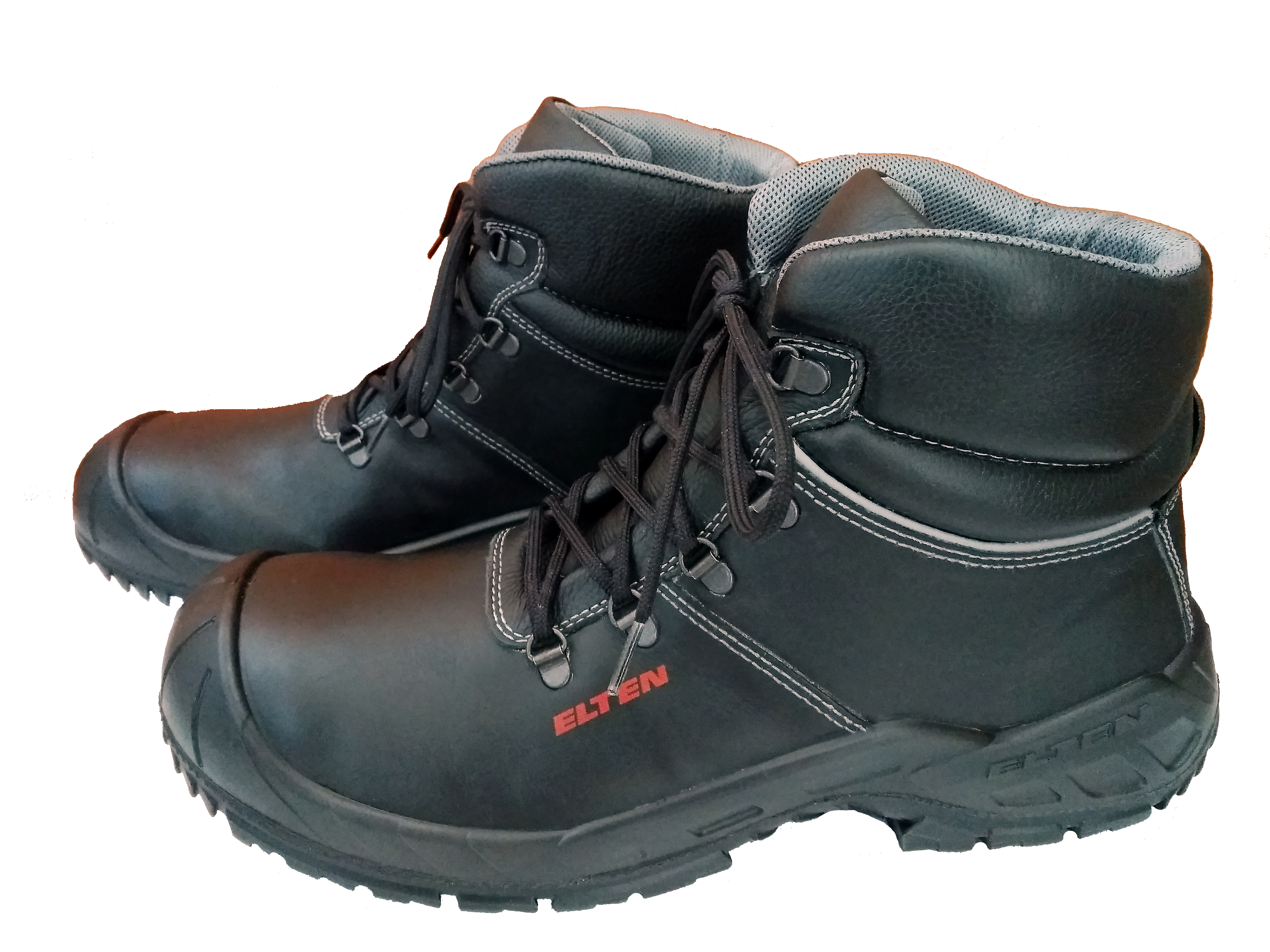
Ian's Secure Shoelace Knot used on a pair of safety boots

There are several more secure alternatives to the common shoelace bow, with names such as Turquoise Turtle Shoelace Knot, or Shoemaker's Knot, Better Bow Shoelace Knot, Surgeon's Shoelace Knot, and Ian's Secure Shoelace Knot, or double slip knot. One such knot has been patented in 1999 under the title "Shoelace tying system". These are all variations of the same concept of looping the top part of the knot twice instead of once, which results in a finished bow of almost identical appearance but with the laces wrapped twice around the middle. This double-wrap holds the shoelaces more securely tied while still allowing them to be untied with a (slightly firmer) pull on the loose end(s). Possibly the simplest, also neat and quite effective, is after tying a common bow to tie a half-hitch with one or other loose end around its adjacent half bow, close to the knot; it is untied by pulling on the other (unhitched) free end.

=== Length ===
The proper length of a shoelace, fitting it to a shoe, varies according to the type of lacing used, as well as the type of lace. However, at a rough reference the following guide can be used.

No of holes	Length (cm)
2	45
3	65
4	75–85
5	85–90
6	100
7	110
8	120
9	
10	130
11	
12	150
13	
14	180
15	
16	200

== Shoe lacing ==
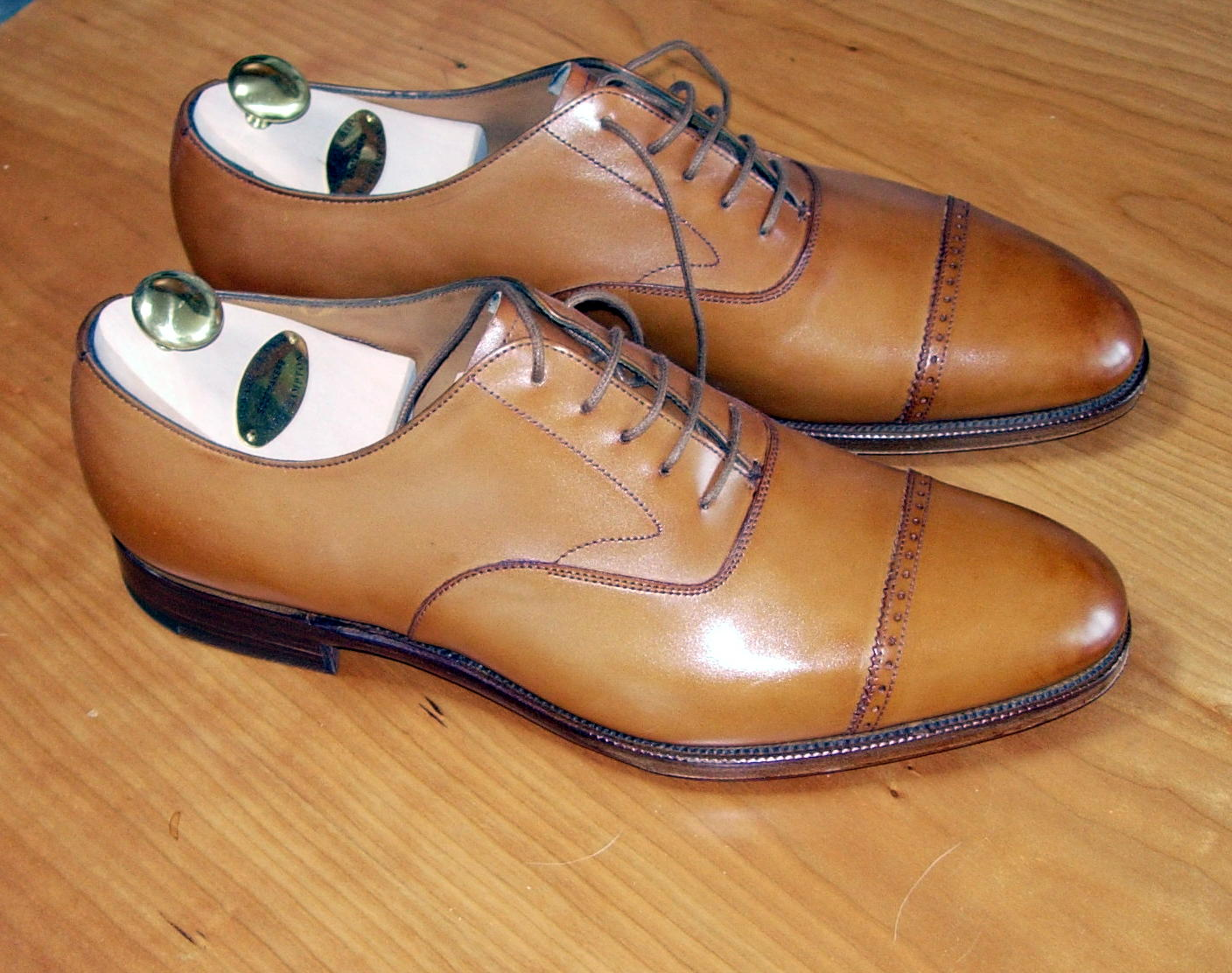
An Oxford shoe with straight lacing

Shoe Lacing Methods

This is the process of running the shoelaces through the holes, eyelets, loops, or hooks to hold together the sides of the shoe with many common lacing methods. There are, in fact, almost two trillion ways to lace a shoe with six pairs of eyelets.

=== Common lacing methods ===
==== Straight-bar lacing ====
Straight-bar lacing appears horizontal and parallel when viewed from the exterior. Formal shoes usually demand straight-bar lacing to preserve their clean, neat look. This is especially true for dress shoes using a closed lacing system such as Oxfords, because the central shoelace crossovers of criss-cross lacing prevent the sides of the shoe from coming together in the middle.

==== Criss-cross lacing ====
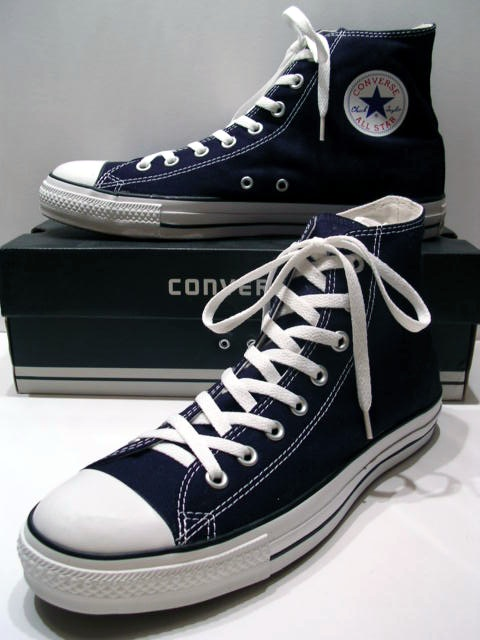
Chuck Taylor All-Stars with criss-cross lacing

The most common lacing method, termed criss-cross lacing, is also one of the strongest and most efficient. However, they are reserved for more casual footwear, such as sneakers and boots. Derby shoes can be straight-bar laced or criss-cross laced.

==== Cobwebbing ====
Cobwebbing footwear such as Jump boots has been used by Paratroopers as means of extra ankle support.

==== Other lacing methods ====
Many shoe lacing methods have been developed with specific functional benefits, such as being faster or easier to tighten or loosen, binding more tightly, being more comfortable, using up more lace or less lace, adjusting fit, preventing slippage, and suiting specific types of shoes. One such method, patented in 2003 as "Double helix shoe lacing process", runs in a double helix pattern and results in less friction and faster and easier tightening and loosening. Another method, called "Rinlers Instant Lace Up", use additional accessories for instant tightening and loosening.

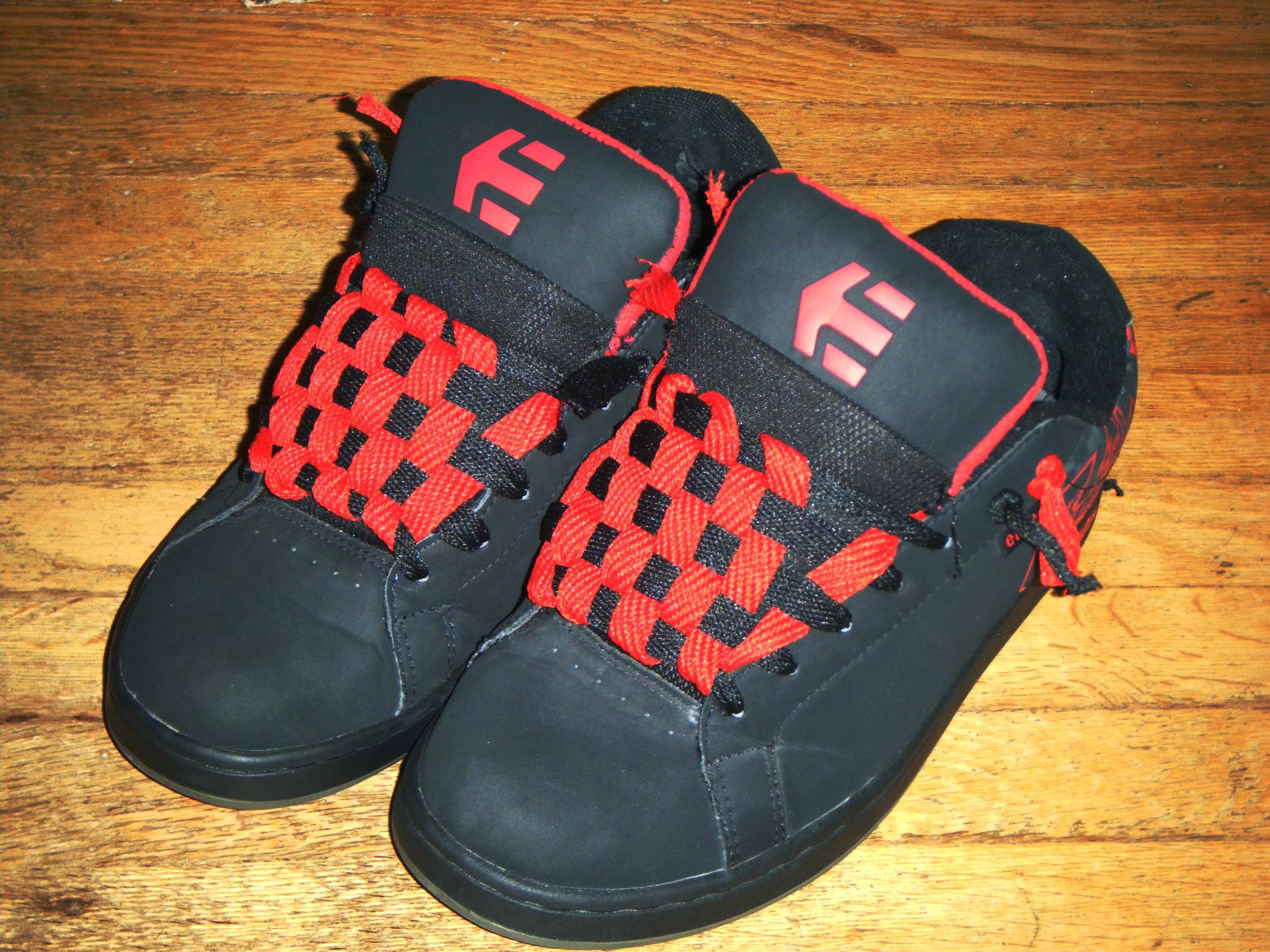
A pair of Etnies shoes with checkerboard laces

Many other lacing methods have been developed purely for appearance, often at the expense of functionality. One of the most popular decorative methods, checkerboard lacing, is very difficult to tighten or loosen without destroying the pattern. Shoes with checkerboard lacing are generally treated as "slip-ons".

== History ==
It is as difficult to determine the exact history of shoelaces as it is for shoes. Archaeological records of footwear are rare because shoes were generally made of materials that deteriorated readily. The Armenian Areni-1 shoe, which has been dated to around 3500 BC, is a simple leather shoe with leather "shoelaces" passing through slotted "eyelets" cut into the hide. The more complex shoes worn by Ötzi the Iceman, who lived around 3300 BC, were bound with "shoelaces" made of lime bark string. Most forms of the upper-class Roman calceus were bound with wide straps fitted into hooks or eyelets down the front and then knotted decoratively.

As for shoelaces in the sense that is known in modern times, the Museum of London has documented examples of medieval footwear dating from as far back as the 12th century, which clearly show the lacing passing through a series of hooks or eyelets down the front or side of the shoe and being tied in a knot rather than hanging loose. Indeed, the code of the Knights Templar banned the wearing of shoelaces as a vanity that was "abominable and pagan".

The introduction of aglets, hard tips of metal or otherwise, to each end of the shoelace in order to prevent fraying was patented and popularised by Harvey Kennedy in the UK in 1790.

=== Myths ===
A popular myth states that Gurkha soldiers, fighting for Britain, crawled along the ground, feeling the laces of the soldiers they encountered. British soldiers employed straight- or bar-lacing, while Japanese troops employed a criss-cross pattern. Criss-cross laces could therefore mean the difference between life and death. The importance of correct lacing was thus emphasized to British troops. Whether true or not, there is an account of Gurkha soldiers checking the boots and laces of soldiers they encounter in the dark to find if they are friend or foe.

=== CIA shoelace code ===
The CIA used types of lacing as a form of communications with other agents.

== Shoelace accessories ==
A deubré on a Nike Air Force 1 sneaker.

There are many shoelace accessories. There are hooks to help lace shoelaces tightly. They are especially useful for skates where tight lacing is important. Shoelace covers protect the laces, especially in wrestling. Shoelace charms are decorative, as are colored shoelaces. Some laces are colored using expensive dyes, other, more "personal" colors, are drawn-on with permanent markers. Some dress codes (especially high schools) will specifically exclude color laces and charms. Lace-locks hold laces together, eliminating the need for tying. There are shoelace tags, sometimes called deubré, with two holes or slots through which the shoelace is passed. These are worn on the section of shoelace closest to the toes, in other words the last lace, so that the image or writing on the tag is visible (as can be seen in the adjacent photo).

Magnetic shoe closures are a type of adaptive clothing accessory which can be laced onto the shoe and used to tighten or loosen the shoe, without the wearer having to tie or untie the laces.

== Photos of shoelaces ==
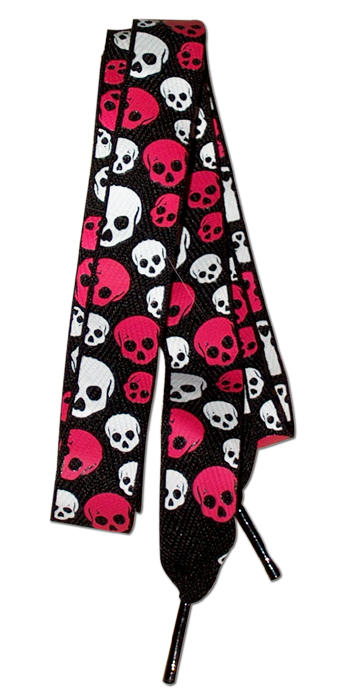
A shoelace featuring red and white skulls

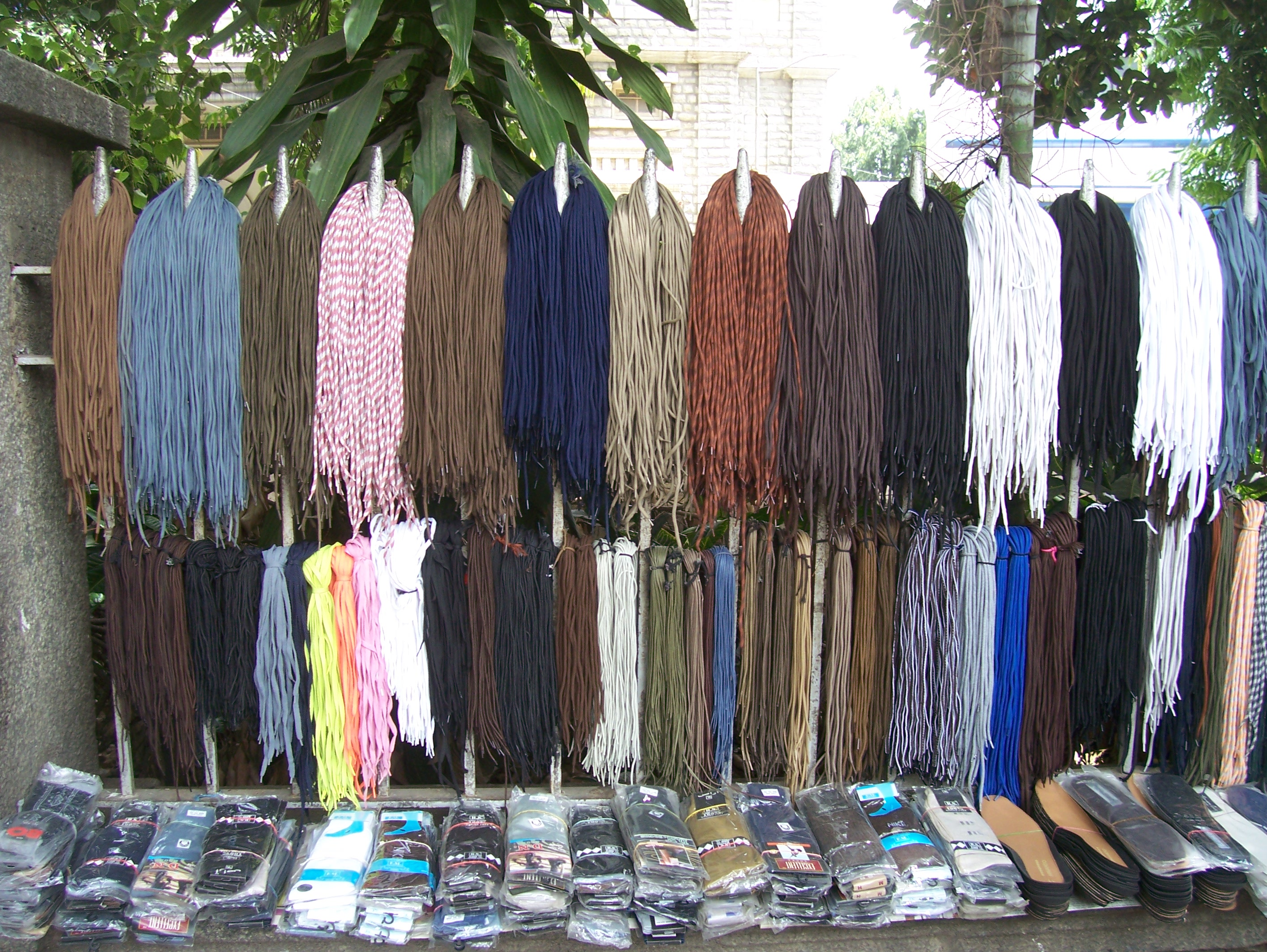
Shoelaces for sale on Avenue Road in Bangalore

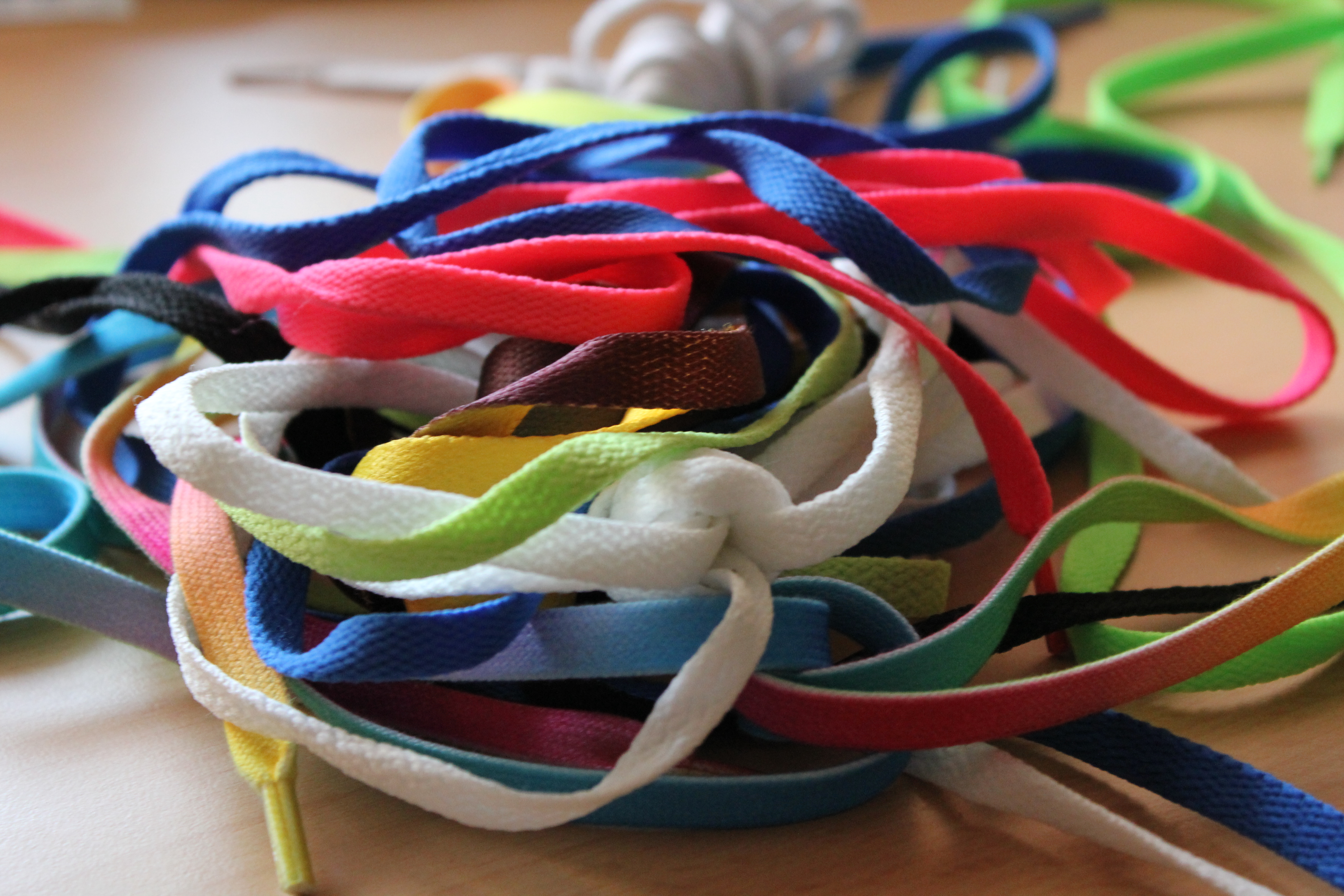
Shoelaces in various colors

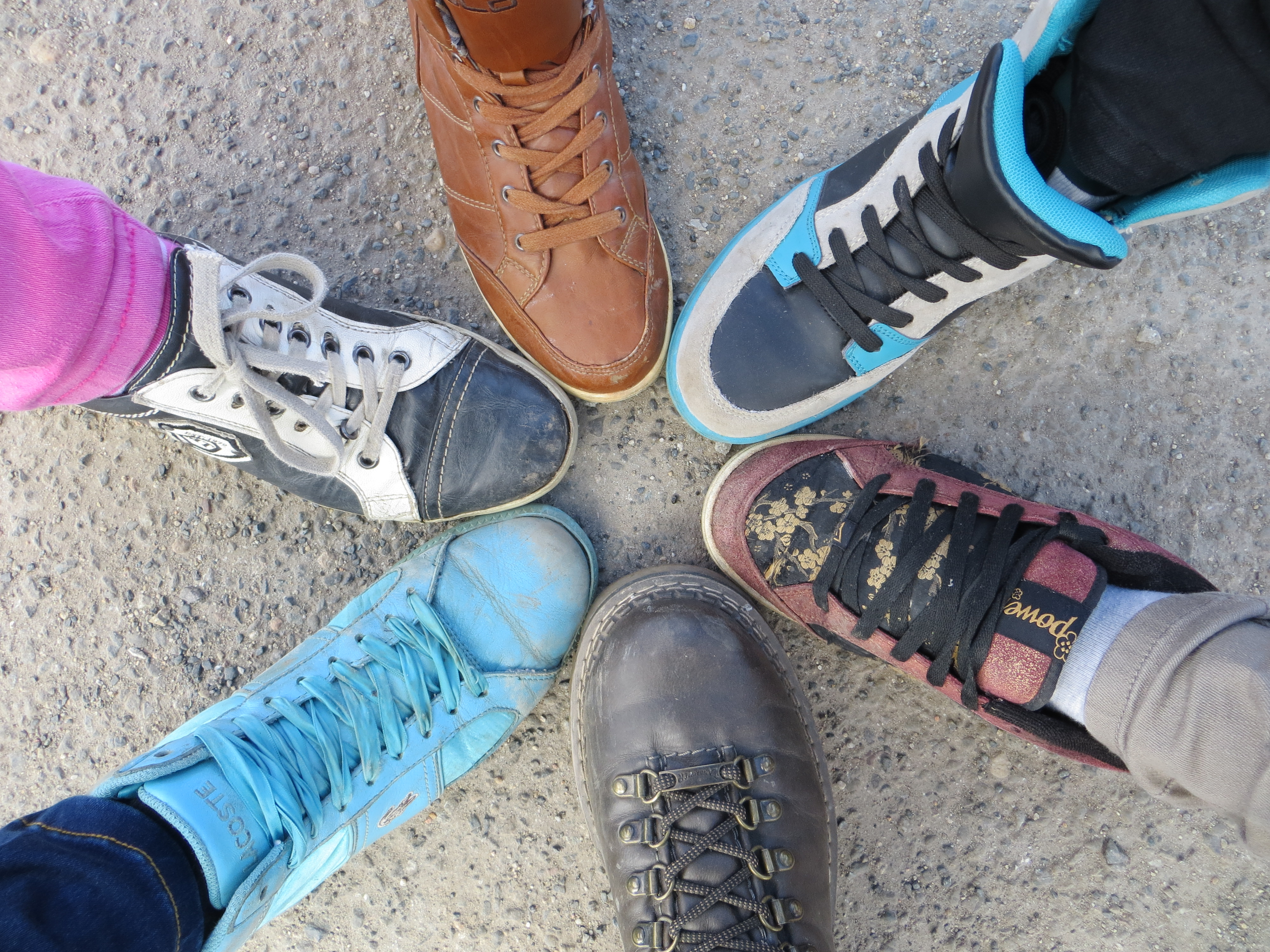
Lacing assortment

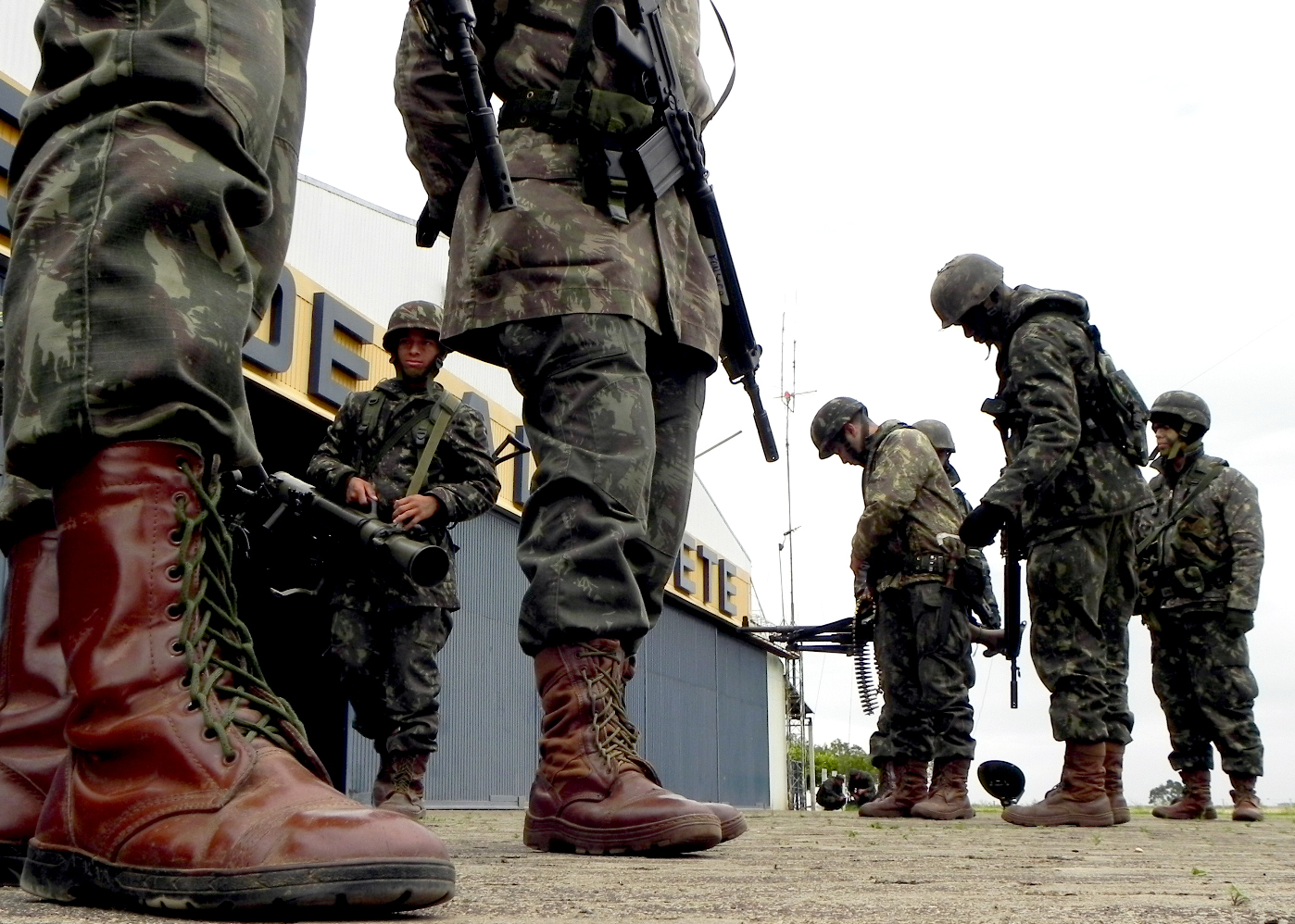
Brazilian soldiers with cobwebbed boot laces using green paracord

== See also ==
- Drawstring, similar in concept
- Charles-François Richard
