= Decoration of the Lily =

French medal from 1814 to 1831

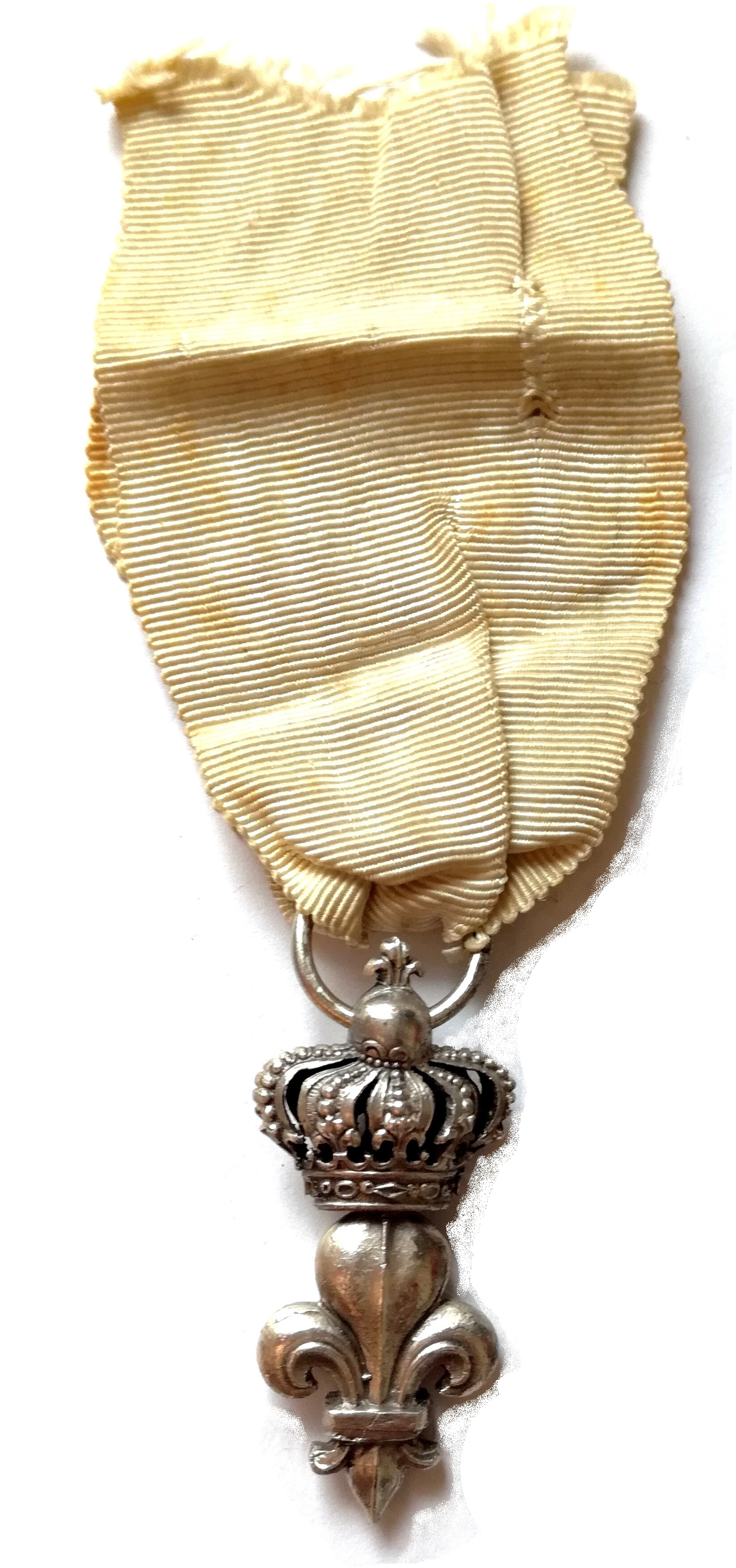

Awarded by Louis XVIII
- Type: Chivalric order in one class
- Established: 26 April 1814
- Status: Disestablished
- Grades: Member
- Ribbon of the decoration

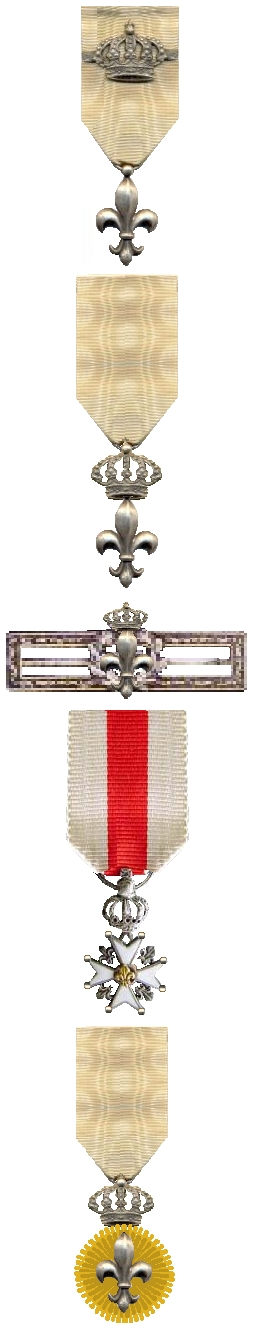

The Decoration of the Lily (French: Décoration du Lys) was a French medal created by the Bourbon Restoration in 1814.

== Background ==
From the end of 1813, Napoleon's armies were fighting on their own soil, culminating in the Six Days' Campaign. Napoleon ended his reign with a series of Pyrrhic victories which could not save the Empire, and he abdicated on 5 April 1814. In a Paris occupied by the forces of the Coalition, the National Guard ensured public order by wearing a white cockade, abandoning the Revolutionary tricolour cockade, and it was on this corps that the returning Bourbons chose to found their power, rather than the Imperial armies and their officers, which they judged still to be too unreliable.

== Creation ==
King Louis XVIII arrived in Paris on 3 May with his brother Charles de France, Comte d'Artois, the future Charles X. It was then that little medals with the image of the new king and fleurs de lys, on white ribbons, began to circulate to reassure and appease the Paris population.

One of the comte d'Artois's orders of the day, on 26 April 1814, created the Décoration du Lys for the garde nationale of Paris as "a perpetual sign of the services it has rendered, whether in fighting for their homes and, charged alone on the night of 30 March with ensuring Paris's guard and safety, preserving the king's capital for the king and the goods, lives and honour of so many families, or – when occupying posts beside those of the troops of the line – it rendered them an example of devotion and sacrifice, or when – despite this painful service – it acted as the maison militaire du Roi and granted the royal family the satisfaction of, for their guard, not being surrounded by the French."

By an order of the day on 9 May 1814, king Louis XVIII approved the creation of the Décoration du Lys, extending it to all the gardes nationales of France. It was awarded to the national guards after they took the following oath – "I swear fidelity to God, and to the King, forever" The granting of the Décoration du Lys induced the grant of an official patent.

Assuring the loyalty of the social elite to the new monarchy thanks to this simple honour, the award of the Décoration du Lys would be extended again and again, quickly starting to be awarded in all France's regions then royal officials granted them successively to generals, ministers, prefects, and finally even mayors. It was banned during the Hundred Days, then reinstated on the Second Restoration, only to be suppressed once and for all by an ordinance of Louis Philippe I on 10 February 1831.

== Beneficiaries ==
- Order of 26 April 1814: the Décoration du Lys was to be granted solely to the troops of the national guard of Paris "officers, sous-officiers, grenadiers or chasseurs who have justified their well-deserving them"
- Order of 9 May 1814: the granting of the Décoration du Lys was extended to all the national guards of France.

Then it was awarded equally to officials of various administrations, to notables, to deputation members, to high-level and general officers, etc.

== Characteristics ==
=== Ribbons ===
- Ordinance of 26 April 1814 : a simple white ribbon.
- Ordinance of 9 May 1814 : white ribbon moiré with a white rosette; but to distinguish the garde nationale de Paris, the arms of Paris were embroidered or marked on the ribbon
- Ordinance of 5 August 1814 : the ribbon of the Garde nationale de Paris became white with, along each side, a 2mm blue stripe.
- Ordinance of 5 February 1816 : each of the gardes nationales départementales bore the Décoration du Lys on a ribbon specific to its department, with only 12 of France's 86 departments retaining the white ribbon.

=== Bars ===
- Ordinance of 9 May 1814 : for civil holders, the king authorised the wearing of a simple white ribbon, sometimes with a three-band bar, generally in silver but sometimes in gold, representing a reduction of the croix du Lys, or a lily (often crowned and bordered by two olive branches)

As with the croix du Lys, some bore the inscription Gage de la paix- Vive le Roi. These bars were sometimes borne on the ribbon of the Légion d'Honneur.

=== Insignia ===
- Ordinance of 26 April 1814 : a simple fleur de lys in silver.
- Ordinance of 9 May 1814 : a silver fleur de lys from the royal crown.
- Ruling of 31 August 1816 : after too many abuses of the insignia (mostly eccentric), the count of Artois fixed the definitive rules for wearing the Décoration du Lys.
- 5 May 1824 : the grand chancellor of the Légion d'honneur recalled that "the Décoration du Lys having furnished a pretext for a multitude of abuses, the king put its supervision under the grand chancellor. He therefore recalled that this decoration must only be a simple silver fleur de lys hung from a white ribbon or of the colours set out for each of the departments of the kingdom (...) The mania for ribbons and decorations, the cupidity of some jewellers, fantasies and whims, made some imagine and make several forms, imitating royal or foreign orders. It was ruled that each ribbon must be worn only for one department and the simple, long-established fleur de lys was to be the only one allowed; all the others were abolished and must disappear."

== Did an Ordre du Lys exist? ==
=== A simple decoration under the Restoration ===
The Decoration of the Lily and the Cross of the Lily are often mistakenly called the "Order of the Lily". This error, which is very widespread, has several origins.

At first, the Count of Artois wanted to make his recent decoration an order, but this was quickly refused by the Chamber.

Then, given the importance of the appointments, from 1824 onwards, they were controlled by the Grand Chancellery of the Legion of Honour. Some collectors wanted to believe that this made it a French Order. However, there was never a grand master, a specific chancery, or a meeting of the decorated. It has never been notified in official documents under the designation of order. None of the diplomas, patents and letters of appointment mention Order of the Lily, always Decoration of the Lily or Decoration of the Fleur-de-lys.

=== A Legitimist dynastic order ===
Henri, Count of Chambord, Henry V for the royalists, distributed decorations of the Lily of a specific model with his profile on the face.

Jacques de Bourbon, legitimist pretender to the throne of France as Jacques I, declared himself Grand Master of the Order of the Lily (1909). It is probable that the rather large models with the boar's head date from this period; unless they date from the re-editions of the Second Empire or the aborted Third Restoration.

== Décoration de la Fidélité ==
In 1816 the 600 National Guards serving in Paris in 1815 received the Fidelity Decoration, created by order of Louis XVIII on 5 February 1816 to replace the Décoration du Lys. Strictly speaking, it was not a new decoration but mainly a particular version of the Décoration du Lys, albeit one strictly reserved for these 600 Guards. It was in gold, and not widely awarded. Again, official texts speak of a "decoration" rather than an "order" of fidelity.

== Décoration du brassard de Bordeaux ==
The Bordeaux Armband Decoration is a decoration created by Louis, Duke of Angoulême on 5 June 1814, and recreated on 6 September 1814 by Louis XVIII of France.

As a commemoration and to his liking, this prince decorated the royal volunteers and the royal guards with the concession to wear a white bracelet with green details and a few millimeters from the edges with the embroidered arms of France.
