= List of air rage incidents =

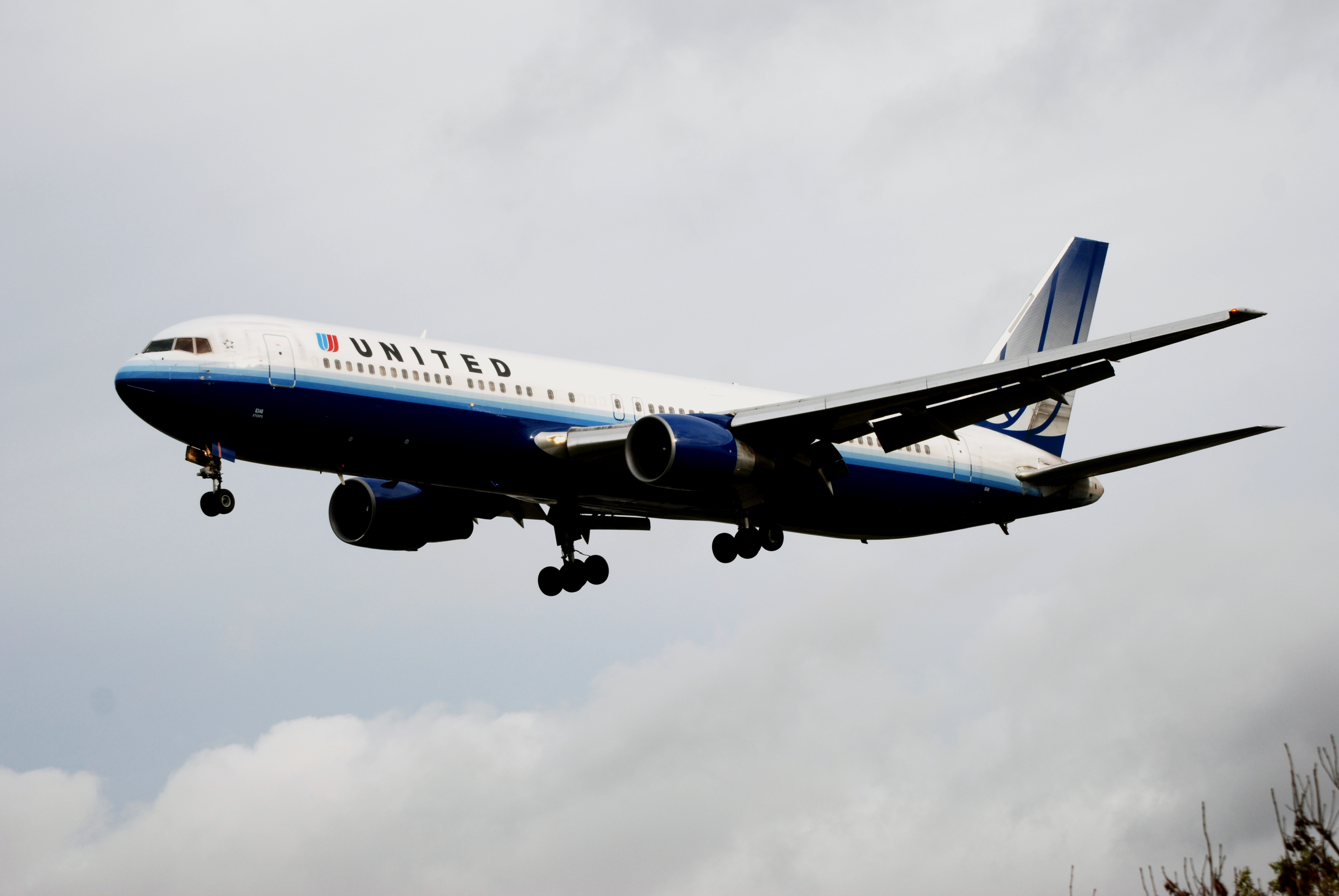
United Airlines Flight 976

Air rage occurs when airline personnel or passengers act violently or disruptively towards others. When these incidents have occurred in flight, they have often required the pilots to divert and make an emergency landing in order to remove the individual(s), as the safety of those on board cannot be guaranteed otherwise. On the ground they have led to delayed departures. In the case of unruly passengers, the incidents have resulted in criminal charges; unruly crew often face disciplinary action including termination and, in some cases, charges as well.

Contents
Pre-1990s					1940s	1950s	1960s			
1990s					1994	1995	1996	1997	1998	1999
2000s	2000	2001	2002	2003	2004	2005	2006	2007	2008	2009
2010s	2010	2011	2012	2013	2014	2015	2016	2017	2018	2019
2020s	2020	2021	2022	2023	2024	2025	2026			

== Pre-1990s ==
=== 1940s ===
- The first documented case of air rage was recorded in 1947 on a flight from Havana to Miami, when a drunk man assaulted another passenger and a flight attendant.

=== 1950s ===
- Another early documented case involved a flight in Alaska in 1950, when a 243-pound (110 kg) man with a known criminal record attacked a flight attendant on a Douglas DC-3 plane. A co-pilot and two other passengers restrained the man with a cargo tiedown.

=== 1960s ===
- On December 23, 1964, 22-year-old musician Brian Wilson of the Beach Boys was to accompany his bandmates on a two-week U.S. concert tour, but while on a flight from Los Angeles to Houston, suffered his first nervous breakdown. Five minutes after the plane had taken off, Wilson placed a pillow over his face and began crying and shouting. He recalled, "I told the stewardess, 'I don't want any food. Get away from me.' Then I started telling people that I'm not getting off the plane. I was getting far out, coming undone, having a breakdown, and I just let myself go completely." The plane completed its flight successfully, although Wilson ultimately declared to his bandmates that he would withdraw from all future concert tours. Loren Schwartz, a former acquaintance of Wilson's, later suggested that Wilson had feigned mental illness during the flight as part of a calculated "ploy to get off the road". Entertainment Weekly ranked the incident number 33 on a list of the "100 Greatest Moments in Rock".

== 1990s ==
=== 1994 ===
- Northwest Airlines Flight 206: On an October 22, 1994 flight from Detroit to Washington, radio talk show host Julianne Malveaux, 41, swore at a child who accidentally bumped her while she was asleep in her seat, then at a flight attendant who accidentally sprayed her with a can of soda when it opened. When another flight attendant asked her to put away her laptop before the plane landed, she grabbed the woman's arm. As a result of this she was arrested on landing and charged with assault; she was sentenced to probation.

=== 1995 ===
- United Airlines Flight 976: Angry after flight attendants refused to serve him more alcohol due to his visible intoxicated state, Gerard Finneran, a 59-year-old Wall Street investment banker, flying from Buenos Aires to New York on October 20, got out of his seat and harassed and assaulted the flight attendants in response before he defecated on a service cart in the first-class section in full view of other passengers and began running around the cabin, leaving feces in his footprints and smearing some of it on the walls. Further food service was canceled due to the unsanitary conditions created. The pilot asked to make an emergency landing at Luis Muñoz Marín International Airport in San Juan to have the man removed from the plane and taken into custody, but other passengers, including Argentine foreign minister Guido di Tella and Portuguese president Mário Soares, and air controllers, would not allow the diversion due to the security risks involved with foreign dignitaries on board. When the plane landed, the man was arrested by the FBI on several charges of interfering with a flight crew. Finneran eventually pled guilty to one count of making a threat, was fined $5,000 and sentenced to 300 hours of community service. He also agreed to reimburse United $1,000 for its costs involved in cleaning the aircraft's interior, and his fellow passengers $48,000 for their tickets. This incident has been recalled as one of the worst cases of air rage.
- On a November flight from Frankfurt to Washington Dulles International Airport, a 36-year-old passenger threatened a flight attendant whom he accused of repeatedly bumping him with the drinks cart. After the attendant had apologized and moved away, the passenger attacked the attendant, as well as another attendant who tried to intervene, until passengers could restrain him. He was arrested on landing, and shortly afterward pleaded guilty to interfering with a flight crew, receiving six months' unsupervised probation as his sentence. The passenger's lawyer attributed his client's behavior to sleep deprivation and stress over having to fly back to the U.S. for his father's funeral.
- After an attendant on a November 22 United flight from London to Dulles caught a Gloucester man smoking in the lavatory, he slammed the door on the female attendant's foot and assaulted other crew who came to assist. He was arrested on arrival by the FBI and charged with three counts of interfering with a flight crew; investigators soon learned that he had a lengthy criminal record in the United Kingdom. After pleading guilty, he was sentenced to 30 months, one of the first instances of air rage to result in prison time.
- On December 18, a group of 18 British and Irish tourists who became drunk and rowdy and had a food fight on a Northwest flight from London to Minneapolis were restrained by members of the U.S. freestyle wrestling team who were also aboard. Some members of the group supposedly dispatched their children to steal liquor from the drinks carts after the crew had cut them off. A 25-year-old member of the group assaulted a flight attendant who had tried to restrain him. He was arrested on landing, pled guilty to the charge, and was sentenced to a month in jail, most of which he had already served.

=== 1996 ===
- A Saudi princess, Salwa al-Qahtani, a wife of Prince Abdullah bin Faisal, son of King Faisal of Saudi Arabia, was arrested after a January 20, 1996, TWA flight from Paris to Boston. A dispute between her and a flight attendant that began when the attendant told her to return to her seat during takeoff escalated into violence after the princess, who was intoxicated, became angry that she was not being served drinks fast enough. The airline was cited by the FAA for serving alcohol to an already intoxicated passenger. She reached a plea agreement where she did not admit guilt but instead was fined $500 and placed on six months unsupervised probation, a punishment that the union representing the flight attendant considered far too lenient.
- USAir Flight 292: A 40-year-old man from Pooler, Georgia, was apparently intoxicated when he boarded the Boeing 737 flying from Savannah to Charlotte on July 6, 1996. He had told the gate agents he did not want any more to drink, but then once on board asked for mixed drinks, which the flight attendants denied. After takeoff, he overpowered the lead attendant and banged her head against the wall, then assaulted other crew and passengers who had attempted to rescue her. The captain returned to Savannah, where the man was arrested. Later that year he pleaded guilty to interfering with a flight crew. He was sentenced to four years and three months in prison followed by 200 hours of community service, and was required to submit to regular drug and alcohol testing and reimburse USAir for the cost of turning the plane around.

=== 1997 ===
- After Cambodian businessman Teng Bunma, 55, deplaned from a Royal Air Cambodge flight from Hong Kong to Phnom Penh on April 8, 1997, an airline representative informed him that his luggage would be unloaded only after he paid an additional $600 fee. In response, he borrowed a handgun from one of his bodyguards and shot out one of the tires of the 737 he had arrived on, costing the airline $3,000 in repair costs. He said later that he would have shot them all out but there were too many passengers standing around. He also further explained his grievances against the airline: The pilot had been rude to him when he boarded, he claimed, the plane arrived late, his luggage was lost and the airline offered only a fraction of its value as reimbursement. It took two days to replace the tire.
- Continental Airlines Flight 1837: An hour before a flight from Houston landed at Los Angeles International Airport on June 14, 1997, two passengers, a man and a woman, told the crew that there were people with bombs and guns at the rear of the plane and that they were going to open the cabin doors. The male passenger grabbed hot coffee and poured it over the flight attendant, resulting in severe burns. The female passenger kicked a hole through the cockpit door while attempting to enter it. After the plane landed, they were arrested. The male passenger got a three-year prison sentence while the female passenger received two.
- US Airways Flight 38: Shortly before a plane from Los Angeles began its approach to Baltimore/Washington International Airport on December 16, 1997, one passenger, a 21-year-old Santa Monica College football player, began walking up and down the aisles telling fellow passengers he was filled with the spirit of Jesus and blessing them with a pillow. After being persuaded to sit down, he got up again and attempted to enter the cockpit. This time he resisted violently when efforts were made to return him to his seat. One attendant was injured severely enough to require three surgeries yet passengers and crew were able to subdue him for the remainder of the flight. After being arrested on landing, the passenger claimed that he was on LSD at the time. After being convicted of assault and reckless endangerment of an aircraft, he was sentenced to 3 years' probation and 150 hours of community service, fined $1,500, ordered to see a psychiatrist, and required—for three years—to obtain written permission from any airline before flying on it.

=== 1998 ===
- British Airways Flight 1611: Stone Roses lead singer Ian Brown was sentenced to four months in prison after he threatened to chop a flight attendant's hands off and attempted to break into the cockpit as the flight from Paris was descending to Manchester Airport on February 13.
- An April British Airways flight from Gatwick to Orlando diverted to Boston where Massachusetts State Police troopers took a 33-year-old man from Nottingham off the plane and arrested him after he had attempted to kiss a flight attendant, damaged food service equipment and threatened crew before being restrained. He pleaded guilty to malicious destruction of property, interfering with the operation of an aircraft and indecent assault and battery, drawing a $10,000 fine.
- After boarding a July 9 Spirit Airlines flight from Fort Lauderdale, Florida, to Atlantic City, New Jersey, a 37-year-old female passenger sprayed perfume on the seats around her to cover a foul odor that she said she had smelled and verbally abused a flight attendant who had asked her to stop. After takeoff, she screamed at a group of three children traveling alone to stop moving in their seats, then fell asleep. When one of the children reclined his seat, she awoke, swore at the child, and then kicked the seat down so hard that it collapsed on the boy, causing head injuries. She was arrested and charged with assault. At trial, she claimed diminished capacity as a defense, citing a diagnosis of bipolar disorder subsequent to the incident; she was nevertheless convicted and sentenced to 3 months' house arrest, 200 hours of community service with the provision that it not be done around children, and fines and restitution payments totalling $16,000. Spirit banned her from further flights; the children's parents also sued her.
- Airtours Flight 463: A 31-year-old Coventry man admitted that he had consumed most of a litre bottle of vodka before boarding the October 30 flight from Gatwick Airport to Málaga. He consumed more on the plane and became so disruptive that a flight attendant asked him to stop smoking and informed him that Spanish police were waiting for him when the plane arrived. The man responded by smashing his bottle over her head and attempting to stab her with it, permanently scarring her face in the process, until he was restrained by other passengers. He also injured one of the Spanish officers while resisting arrest. At trial, the man argued that he was so drunk he should not have been allowed on the plane in the first place; a Spanish court nevertheless sentenced him to four years and four months in prison, and ordered him to pay £6,610 in restitution to the flight attendant and police officer he injured. British authorities banned him from flying on any of that country's airlines.
- On December 5, a Malev Airlines flight from Bangkok to Budapest had to make an emergency landing at Istanbul Atatürk Airport after a Finnish man, who had allegedly assaulted crew, died on board. After being restrained and confined to his seat, he was injected with tranquilizers. The autopsy showed that those drugs, combined with alcohol already in his system, killed him.

=== 1999 ===
- British Airways Flight 9: Before boarding the flight from Heathrow to Bangkok on January 15, a passenger from Hong Kong consumed three double shots of Jack Daniel's and a Valium. During the flight he attacked fellow passengers, biting a woman's headphones in half and smashing a window blind. He was arrested upon arrival and returned to Britain, where he pled guilty and was sentenced to 16 months in prison.
- On March 26, a teenager from Dublin was arrested and charged with threatening passengers and crew on an Aer Lingus flight from Shannon Airport to Chicago. He had grown verbally abusive after being angry that drinks were not being offered quickly enough and threatened flight attendants with physical harm.
- US Airways Flight 677: A Yale history professor was arrested after assaulting a flight attendant who he later claimed had been rude to him on a March 18 flight from Pittsburgh to South Bend, Indiana. He was fined $1,100 by the Federal Aviation Administration, the maximum penalty at the time for passenger unruliness.
- On a May 14 Air France flight from Dakar to Paris, a Senegalese passenger attempted to enter the cockpit. In response, passengers and crew restrained him, and then a doctor on board used a tranquilizer in the plane's medical kit to sedate him. When it became apparent that the passenger was suffering from a severe medical problem, the plane made an emergency landing at Bordeaux–Mérignac Airport where emergency medical technicians attempted for 45 minutes to revive him. The passenger died; his death was attributed to a heart attack.
- British Airways Flight 56: After passengers complained that a 36-year-old British passenger was watching hardcore pornography on his laptop during a May 16 flight from Johannesburg to London, the head flight attendant asked him to stop. The passenger, who had consumed alcohol before boarding and had consumed more on the plane, responded by going on a violent rampage, assaulting and injuring several other crew members and doing £30,000 in damage to the plane, including breaking the inner skin on a door hatch window. He was finally restrained enough for a physician on the flight to inject him with diazepam, although repeated doses were necessary and the seats in front of him had to be loosened with a crowbar to keep him from constantly head-butting them. After landing the passenger was arrested, he was convicted of assault and endangering a plane and passengers a few months later, leading to a three-year sentence.
- Delta Air Lines Flight 64: After being refused an additional drink on the June 5 flight from Atlanta to his native Manchester, a male passenger fondled flight attendants and eventually wound up struggling with several other passengers, spitting blood from his broken lip at one who was finally able to restrain him. The flight was diverted to Bangor International Airport, where the passenger was taken off and arrested. A trial on the felony charge of interfering with a flight crew ended with a hung jury, but he was later convicted of a misdemeanor assault charge and sentenced to six months in prison plus a $5,000 fine. He appealed, arguing the government had failed to prove specific intent, but the U.S. Court of Appeals for the First Circuit upheld the conviction.
- An English court called on Parliament to stiffen penalties for air rage in July after sentencing a 32-year-old Dundee man to the maximum of two years in prison following a Continental Airlines flight from Newark to Gatwick earlier that year on which, drunk on boarding, the man had escalated from flicking bits of paper and food at other passengers to threatening and assaulting crew. Eventually he attempted to open the hatch while the plane was at 33,000 feet; a flight attendant stood spread-eagled in front of it to prevent that from happening, which did not prevent the man from kicking it eight times.
- On July 22, a Continental Airlines gate agent at Newark International Airport suffered a broken neck that left him comatose and requiring surgery after he was assaulted by a passenger whom he had blocked from going down the jetway to retrieve his young daughter. In 2001, the man was acquitted of assault charges after jurors accepted his defense that he did not initiate the confrontation. Continental banned him from flying the airline.
- A Vietnamese national was arrested on July 24 after the Delta Air Lines flight he was on landed at McCarran International Airport. After being told to sit down and wait for a drink, he had gotten up to overturn the drink cart, spilling coffee on a woman and her baby, and then assaulted two other passengers, including a 12-year-old girl. In January 2000 the passenger was sentenced to six months in prison plus five years' probation, as well as the judge also banning him from flying commercially for two years and ordering him to pay $4,200 in restitution to the airline. The passenger explained that his actions were the result of medication he took for schizophrenia having been confiscated earlier in the day while he was returning from Vietnam.
- A 38-year-old passenger from Garland, Texas was sentenced to six months in prison by a Singaporean court for his actions on a Singapore Airlines flight to that city from Tokyo on August 5. After heavy alcohol consumption on the trans-Pacific leg of the flight from Los Angeles, he boarded the plane to Singapore intoxicated. During flight, he attempted to enter the cockpit. When a flight attendant prevented this, he then attempted to open an emergency exit during flight, shouting "We're all going to die!"
- A British passenger was arrested on August 14 after punching a flight attendant and assaulted several others on a British Airways jet from Perth. He was sentenced to a year in prison and fined £360.
- United Airlines Flight 951: A 37-year-old Belgian was sentenced by a U.S. federal court to four months in prison and fined $5,000 for assaulting and threatening a crew member on an August 29 flight from Belgium to Dulles International Airport.
- On August 29, a Canada 3000 flight from Amsterdam to Calgary diverted to Manitoba's Churchill Airport after Robin DeGroot, 36, of Rotterdam, drunkenly assaulted several members of the cabin crew. He pleaded guilty to the charges and was fined CAN$4,600, the maximum fine at the time, plus court costs.
- KLM Flight UK2023: A British man was arrested after his September 7 flight from Amsterdam landed at Manchester, the first person to be charged under a newer, tougher English air rage law which had taken effect a week before.
- Shortly after his Swissair flight departed Newark International Airport for Zürich on October 11, a Swiss passenger grabbed the buttocks of a flight attendant, attacked a coworker he was traveling with and remained violent until he was subdued about an hour and a half from departure. The pilot decided to divert to Halifax Stanfield International Airport in the Canadian province of Nova Scotia, where the passenger was taken off; he was the first person to be charged by Canada with endangering the operation of an aircraft. However, after his lawyers introduced evidence that he suffered from bipolar disorder and that his medication for that condition was in his checked luggage (or on another flight), a judge found him not criminally responsible for his actions, and he was allowed to return to Switzerland.
- A 33-year-old passenger was arrested when his October 26 Flying Colours Airlines Boeing 757 arrived in his native Glasgow. Even before takeoff from Mallorca he had alarmed fellow passengers by claiming loudly that the plane would not be taking off due to a fire on the runway. After the plane took off anyway, he continued shouting, swearing and threatening to assault crew when the plane reached Glasgow. He explained that he had been upset that the plane's video screens were not working, which had also been the case on the airline's flight to Mallorca, and thus his children would have nothing to distract them. He was sentenced to two months in jail.
- British Airways captain Stuart Clapson, 52, had an abusive verbal outburst at a passenger that same day at Gatwick. After she reported her suspicions to the head flight attendant that a nearby man's package might be a bomb, the flight for Barbados was delayed in taking off so she could be removed from the plane. Before turning back to the gate, Clapson announced to the passengers that "[a] stupid lady is spoiling all your holidays. I am going to get her off the aircraft and get the police who are going to arrest her and put her in jail." When the plane reached the gate, he left the cockpit and further berated the woman in person. The flight left an hour after its scheduled departure; the woman was put on a later flight. Clapson was demoted and, after he appealed that decision, terminated. He later sued the airline over the incident and won reinstatement.

== 2000s ==
=== 2000 ===
- An Airtours flight was affected by an alcohol-fueled air rage incident on January 31: a group of 12 Irish Travellers from Lewisham boarded a flight to Jamaica from Gatwick while drunk and smelling of alcohol. After takeoff they sang loudly, used profane language, and threw various objects at flight attendants who refused their demands for additional beer and liquor. A Jamaican passenger who was irritated by their behavior threw beer on one of the group, leading to a brief physical altercation before the captain diverted to Norfolk International Airport in the U.S. state of Virginia. FBI agents then boarded the plane and removed all 12 travellers. After extradition to the UK, several of them were tried; one was sentenced to 18 months in prison, while another who had tried to join the fight with him, was sentenced to three months.
- EVA Airlines Flight 5: Cantopop star Ronald Cheng, 27, had taken half a sleeping pill in addition to becoming intoxicated before boarding this February 19 flight at Los Angeles International Airport. He soon became disruptive and, when confronted by flight attendants, assaulted them, putting one in a headlock: after several passengers and the co-pilot were also assaulted while attempting to deal with Cheng, the plane's captain hit him over the head with a flashlight. This incapacitated the singer long enough for the plane to divert to Alaska's Anchorage International Airport, where he was taken off and arrested so the plane could continue to Taipei without further incident. After Cheng pleaded guilty to assault, he was fined $2,500, given a year of unsupervised probation and ordered to pay the airline compensation.
- Alaska Airlines Flight 259: Shortly after this flight left Puerto Vallarta for San Francisco on March 16, a male passenger began removing his shoes and shirt, muttering to himself and wandering up and down the aisles threatening to kill passengers. When ordered to sit down by crew, he changed seats repeatedly and eventually moved to the first-class section, where he mimed the shape of a gun with his hand and calmly told everyone present he was going to kill them. At one point he tried to open the cabin door. Eventually he assaulted a flight attendant and broke down the cockpit door, where the co-pilot fought him off with an axe, suffering a serious injury in the process, while passengers came up front and restrained the man. Federal charges against him were eventually dropped after his attorneys unearthed evidence that, in addition to having a bad reaction to his high blood pressure medication, the passenger was suffering from an undiagnosed case of viral encephalitis.
- When crew on an April 15 Toronto–Calgary flight refused to serve a fifth beer to passenger, he screamed obscenities at them for the next 20 minutes; upon deplaning, he made further threats against the flight crew and pilots, leading to his arrest and eventual guilty plea to provincial charges of property mischief and uttering threats. He was sentenced to two weeks in jail after his lawyer argued he had forgotten to take his anti-anxiety medication that day due to severe memory loss resulting from years of cocaine and heroin addiction.
- British Airways Flight 48: After attendants on the April 21 flight from Seattle to London refused to serve R.E.M. guitarist Peter Buck, 44, a 16th glass of wine, he became disorderly, tearing up the "yellow card" the airline gives to passengers whose behavior is becoming unacceptable, trying to play a CD on the drinks cart and spraying two flight attendants with yogurt. After his arrest, he attributed his behavior to the interaction of the alcohol with the sleeping pills he took, and claimed to remember nothing between when he fell asleep in his seat and when he woke up at the police station. He was acquitted on the grounds of non-insane automatism.
- Ten minutes after an America West flight left Phoenix, Arizona, for Austin, Texas, on July 12, a deadheading pilot began screaming and throwing magazines. He was restrained by passengers and crew as the plane quickly diverted to Tucson International Airport, where he was taken off by police, cited for disorderly conduct and held in a nearby mental hospital for a 72-hour observation. His family said that while the pilot's job had not been stressful, his personal life had been, due to an acrimonious divorce and a friend's recent suicide.
- Airtours again dealt with an unruly passenger on May 19. The 27-year-old woman was arrested upon returning to Manchester from Florida. Issues between her and the crew, which she claimed were racially motivated on their part, came to a head after she was caught smoking in a lavatory mid-flight. She assaulted three flight attendants, leaving one with a broken nose; the pilot had to put the plane into a holding pattern before landing to make sure the situation had been brought under control. She was charged with assault causing bodily harm and two counts of common assault; she pleaded guilty eventually to endangering the safety of an aircraft, interfering with the performance of an aircraft and affray and was sentenced to nine months in jail.

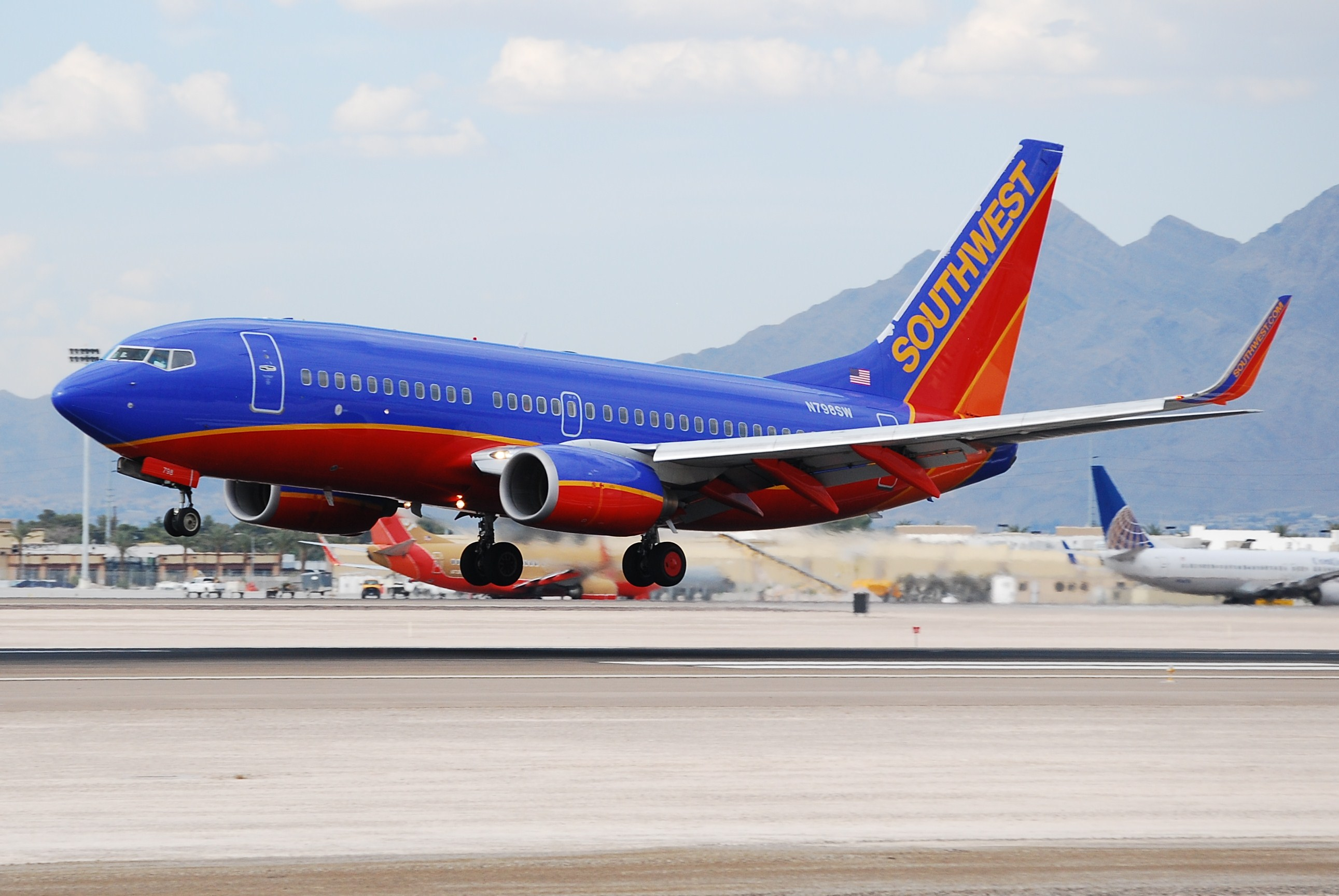
Southwest Airlines Flight 1763

- Southwest Airlines Flight 1763: During the August 11 flight from Las Vegas to Salt Lake City, Jonathan Burton, 19, became agitated, helping himself to drinks, and wandering the aisles until he attempted to kick in the cockpit door. Passengers confined him in the rear, where he then tried to open a cabin door. Despite the restraints, he continued to resist, and before landing some witnesses said he was being actively beaten by those holding him down. He was pronounced dead shortly after arrival; originally the cause was given as a heart attack but then amended to suffocation due to passengers sitting on him and reportedly obstructing airflow through his throat; traces of cocaine and marijuana were found in his system. Paul Warner, the U.S. attorney for Utah, decided not to file charges against any of the other passengers as he had concluded they had acted in self-defense. Burton's family continues to believe his death was preventable and attempt to identify those who they believe perpetrated it.
- Air France Flight 84: A Hungarian passenger was arrested and charged with two counts of assault after the August 16 flight from Paris landed in San Francisco. After growing increasingly agitated mid-flight, he had punched a flight attendant who had refused to serve him more alcohol and a passenger who tried to calm him down.
- On August 26, some passengers waiting to board a Cyprus Airways flight at Athens International Airport became angry and surrounded the plane on the tarmac to prevent its departure; most were residents of Paphos angered when the airline announced, after a two-hour delay to repair damage done to the Airbus A310's luggage compartment, that it would cancel a planned stop in their city and instead fly directly to Larnaca. The protest delayed the departure an additional three hours; the airline, which described the incident as a "hijacking", said it might ban the passenger who led it but did not take any other action.
- Northwest Airlines Flight 5852: Upon landing at Owensboro–Daviess County Regional Airport in Kentucky on October 2, 10 of the 16 passengers aboard, most of them part of a group of professional motorcycle racers, were detained by local police so they could be interviewed by the FBI. During the flight from Memphis, Tennessee, they had been verbally abusive to the flight attendant and pelted her with various objects, reportedly out of frustration that the plane's air conditioning did not work, that no drinks were served and that they were not allowed to use the lavatory.
- On November 30, an America West flight from Las Vegas to Fort Lauderdale diverted to Albuquerque, New Mexico, for the offloading of 16 unruly passengers. When detained and questioned by the FBI, some said they were upset with the free drink coupon given prior to the flight being only worth one drink while others were angry the cabin crew considered them too drunk to serve them. One passenger was charged with committing a crime aboard an aircraft and interference with flight crew for throwing a crumpled beer can and cup full of ice at a flight attendant.
- On December 29, an American Airlines flight from Toronto to Dallas had to divert to Detroit so a passenger could be arrested. He had grown disruptive, at one point assaulting the pilot, after consuming vodka he and his wife had brought on board to deal with his anxiety about flying. He later pleaded guilty to one count of interfering with a flight crew and was sentenced to two months in jail followed by two years of supervised release, fined $4,600 and ordered to pay the airline $9,225 in restitution.

=== 2001 ===
- United Airlines Flight 895: On January 9, 2001, the flight from Chicago to Hong Kong had to divert to Anchorage after a 44-year old male passenger spat at other passengers, swore at flight attendants and ripped a phone out of the plane's wall. Ultimately four other passengers had to restrain and handcuff him. Like some other passengers in air-rage incidents, he said he had combined alcohol and a prescription sleep aid. He later pleaded guilty to misdemeanor assault and was ordered to pay United $30,000 in restitution; he told the court at sentencing that the incident had also cost him his job.

External videos
- Video of the "air rage twins" on UAL Flight 857

- United Airlines Flight 857: After several drinks each, 22-year-old twin sisters began fighting verbally and physically with each other during the April 19, 2001, flight from San Francisco to Shanghai, where they were to take part in a modeling competition. They sneaked into the bathroom to smoke, attempting to cover the smell with perfume, and then began verbally abusing crew and other passengers, at one point asking if they could leave the plane to smoke. Crew who attempted to calm them were assaulted, and when the plane was over a thousand miles west of Anchorage the captain decided to turn back there and have them arrested. A passenger with a video camera recorded the two young women crying and screaming, making the incident one of the first to be documented this way. Since the crew had logged too many hours to continue on to China afterwards, the airline put all the other 231 passengers up in hotels in Anchorage, as well as paying for a tour of the city or Portage Glacier the next day before leaving. The twins stayed behind to face federal charges of interfering with a flight crew; after guilty pleas they were sentenced to probation and community service, fined and banned from flying commercially for five years, save the trip back to Michigan.
- A Singapore Airlines flight from Frankfurt to Singapore had to divert to New Delhi on April 25, 2001, after a 17-year-old Australian passenger became unruly. After consuming beer and wine steadily for the first four hours of the flight, he reacted violently when attendants refused him further service, assaulting other passengers and kicking at walls and doors. A Singaporean court eventually sentenced him to two months in jail.
- Air Canada Flight 792: After an Iranian citizen living in Woodland Hills, California, was caught smoking in the lavatory on the September 26, 2001, flight to Toronto, he became belligerent and made anti-American statements. Since this was shortly after the September 11 attacks, the plane returned to Los Angeles International Airport under fighter escort out of concern that a terrorist incident might have been underway. The man was arrested and charged with interfering with a flight crew.

=== 2002 ===
- A private flight chartered by World Wrestling Entertainment, a Boeing 757 traveling from the United Kingdom to the United States in May 2002, resulted in a number of incidents involving the wrestlers consuming large quantities of drugs and alcohol, fighting with each other, and allegedly sexually harassing the flight attendants. One particular incident involved future UFC champion Brock Lesnar tackling another wrestler into the emergency exit door of the plane mid-flight. Two wrestlers were fired after the incident. The flight attendants on duty sued the WWE in 2004 but settled out of court with the company.
- A man, 47, of Savannah, Georgia, pleaded guilty to assault for his actions on a June 13, 2002, Northwest Airlines flight from Detroit to Osaka. After having three drinks plus draining a bottle of alcohol he had brought with him, the man refused to remain seated and walked around the aisles kissing babies, using profanities and threatening flight attendants. The captain diverted the flight to Anchorage so he could be taken off.
- American actress Rebecca Broussard, 38, assaulted a Virgin Atlantic flight attendant on a June 22, 2002, flight from Los Angeles to London after being refused further alcoholic drinks, forcing the pilot to divert to Winnipeg, Canada, for her to be taken off. She was banned from flying for a month and charged by Canadian authorities with assault and mischief endangering an aircraft; her lawyer told the court that she was so anxious about flying in the wake of the September 11 attacks that she had taken a combination of alcohol and tranquilizers before boarding. She pled guilty to assault and was given conditional release after agreeing to reimburse the airline the $26,000 in costs it incurred and abstain from drugs and alcohol for a month.
- A woman, 32, of Limerick, Ireland, assaulted an Aer Lingus flight attendant who refused her further alcohol on a transatlantic flight in December 2002. She was banned from flying the airline for life and fined a total of €1,250, as well as ordered to pay €800 in costs.
- A half-hour after a December 22, 2002, Aer Lingus flight left Chicago for Dublin a passenger became abusive. He was restrained, but continued to shout profanely at flight attendants, managing eventually to punch one. He was arrested on arrival at Shannon Airport, where he soon pleaded guilty to assault and disruptive behavior aboard an aircraft, actions he blamed on having worked a double shift as a Chicago firefighter just prior to the flight so he could join his wife and children in Ireland for Christmas, depriving him of sleep and thus intensifying the effect of the alcohol he drank to calm himself before the flight. He was fined €600 and ordered to pay €400 to the airline, which banned him for life.

=== 2003 ===
- A passenger was sentenced to 18 months in prison for assaulting the pilot on a LOT Polish Airlines flight from Warsaw to Chicago in January. He was also ordered to undergo treatment for substance abuse and other mental health issues.
- On January 7, a passenger on a Qantas flight from Melbourne to Cairns, took several glasses of wine from his business class seat to his fiancée in economy class. This earned him a warning from a flight attendant not to violate airline policy forbidding such sharing. The passenger ignored the warning and later invited his fiancée to come up to his seat, where he spoonfed her some of his ice cream as she stood in the aisle. When the attendant again asked him to stop and ordered the woman back to her seat, he assaulted and threatened him. He was arrested, but after a diversion hearing was only ordered to donate AU$500 to charity, write a letter of apology to the flight attendant and a thank-you note to a police informant involved in the case.
- Virgin Atlantic Airways Flight 8: Rock singer Courtney Love, 38, was arrested after a February 4 arrival at Heathrow. Crew said she had become uncooperative and verbally abusive on the flight from Los Angeles when asked to return to her seat and put her seat belt on, after previously having complained that one of two psychiatric nurses traveling with her and her personal assistants was not allowed to join her in first class. The charges were dropped, and after Love suggested to the media that the flight might be her last one on the airline, Virgin president Sir Richard Branson apologized to her and said he looked forward to her flying with them again. This reaction in turn drew harsh criticism in the media and from the unions representing British airline crews, leading Branson to backtrack a week later and not only say she should not have been allowed to fly in the first place, the airline would in the future consider her mental state very carefully before allowing her on board.
- An Austrian student, 25, who had reportedly carried a bottle of whiskey on board his October 11 AeroMexico flight from Mexico City to Paris, became unruly while on board. After being restrained, he broke free again and attempted to enter the cockpit. A larger group of passengers worked together to restrain and bind him; during this time he may have been injected with a sedative of some kind, which reportedly induced an immediate reaction. He was pronounced dead when the plane arrived at New York's John F. Kennedy International Airport, where the pilot had diverted due to the incident. The cause was unclear but later found to be a heart attack induced by a combination of the alcohol and his struggles against the passengers trying to restrain him.
- British actor Vinnie Jones, 38, was fined £1,100 and sentenced to 80 hours of community service for his actions on a May 31 Virgin Atlantic flight from Heathrow to Tokyo. It began when a fellow passenger told Jones he was being "annoying" and should sit down after he approached a woman who had moved away from him because of his "boorish" behavior. He responded by slapping the other passenger ten times and yelling "Do you know who I am?" at him. This drew the attention of flight crew, whom Jones told to go make coffee like they were paid to do. When they persisted in warning him to be quiet, he loudly informed the flight attendants present he could have them all killed for £3,000.
- A July Singapore Airlines flight to Brisbane was diverted to Darwin, where a passenger was arrested to the cheers of fellow passengers following his abusive treatment of the cabin crew after they refused his requests for additional liquor starting two hours after takeoff from Singapore. He blamed his behavior on how poorly his vacation in Egypt had gone. Prosecutors dropped the more serious charge of making threats aboard an aircraft, so he avoided jail time, but after his guilty plea to offensive behavior he was fined AU$750.
- After a passenger in front of a female passenger inclined his seat during an August 28, 2003, Air Malta flight to Heathrow, she began kicking it and being verbally abusive. She and her husband were arrested on landing; he was fined £500 in compensation while she got three months.
- Australian authorities arrested a Canadian man on a Cathay Pacific flight from Hong Kong after it landed in Melbourne on December 3. A passenger had become visibly intoxicated following the consumption of red wine. When flight attendants refused him further service, he flew into a rage, assaulting crew, kicking in the door of an occupied lavatory and punching the seat in front of him. After crew relocated the passengers sitting near him, the passenger assaulted two more attendants. Once he had been put in his seat, he urinated on the airplane floor, both inside and outside the lavatory. He pleaded guilty to three counts of assault and one of offensive and disorderly behaviour and was sentenced to three months in jail; Cathay Pacific banned him from flying with them again.

=== 2004 ===
- A 48-year old male passenger from Ballymena, Northern Ireland, was fined €1,700 and given two three-month suspended sentences after an April 17 flight he had boarded at Belfast diverted to Shannon Airport on its way to the Canary Islands so he could be taken into custody by Irish authorities. He had been drinking vodka from a lemonade bottle before boarding; when a flight attendant attempted to help him to the toilet he assaulted her and threatened her and other flight attendants. He had a prior criminal record and the judge suspended the prison time only due to some recent health issues he had suffered that left him unable to work.
- Air rage caused another flight to divert to Shannon a week later. Two passengers on a London-bound American Airlines flight from New York, having been told they could not use the toilet in business class, reacted violently. After being subdued and returned to their seats, flight attendants later discovered one of them had damaged the emergency oxygen system, causing three masks to drop down. While crew members were restraining him, he resisted violently, inciting the other passenger to come to his defense and further assault the attendants trying to restrain him. The pair pleaded guilty to assault, damaging the aircraft and threatening and abusive behavior. They were fined €50,000, €20,000 of which covered repairs to the aircraft, and banned from flying for two years.
- Flybe Flight 140: Before departure from Glasgow on May 13, thirty-seven employees of the Northern Ireland stores of British supermarket chain Tesco were escorted off the plane to Belfast due to what the captain considered rowdy and possibly drunken behavior. The company called the claims "absolutely outrageous", saying the employees had just engaged in "a bit of banter and hand-clapping" and considered legal action.
- Attendants on a July 2004 Aeroflot flight from Moscow to Nizhnevartovsk began food service as the plane was descending, resulting in many food trays ending up on the aircraft floor. After landing, a departing passenger complained to the attendants that they were drunk and not doing their jobs; in response they assaulted him. They were suspended after the passenger reported the incident to local police; an internal investigation by the airline, which said they worked for a subcontractor, found that the attendants were indeed heavily intoxicated during the flight.
- Aer Arann Flight 623: Before the small ATR 72 even took off from Shannon for Cork on August 15, two passengers, both 22, got into a fight with the pilot and broke his nose. A dispatcher who came to the pilot's aid was also assaulted. The two were arrested; it was an unusual instance of air rage on a domestic Irish flight.
- A 36-year old male passenger from Athens was removed from a Delta flight bound for that city from New York when it, too, diverted to Shannon on August 17, after his disorderliness led a federal air marshal to have to restrain him. He was sentenced to three months in jail and fined €300.
- An Australian court fined a 35-year-old passenger $3,000 for charges resulting from his abusive behavior after being told he could not have a sixth small bottle of wine on his September flight from Adelaide to Perth.

=== 2005 ===
- Col. Peter Roberts MBE, 51, senior military attaché to the British embassy in Thailand, was arrested February 17 after his Etihad Airways flight from Abu Dhabi arrived at Heathrow. He was returning to the UK after having spent several weeks identifying British victims of the Indian Ocean tsunami; as a result of the depression that induced he had been prescribed Seroxat. Despite that drug being contraindicated for alcohol consumption, he drank heavily on his connecting flight from Bangkok to Abu Dhabi, as well as in the latter airport; on the flight to Heathrow he reportedly further consumed several small bottles of wine and three of whiskey in addition to some port. He grew loud and abusive, disparaging the king of Thailand, and sat in seats reserved for crew in order to grope passing female passengers. By the time the flight reached Belgian airspace passengers and crew had found it necessary to physically restrain Roberts, who responded by threatening to kill the "wankers" and saying "Do you know who I am? I'm the head of the British government in Thailand and you're treating me like this." He broke through three of the plastic handcuffs used. Roberts claimed due to his heavy level of medication and intoxication to have no memory of the incident. After a six-day trial in early 2006 he was acquitted of all charges; however, the judge denied him his application for costs.
- American Airlines Flight 4: A 48-year old passenger from Brooklyn, New York, had to be restrained by a group of seven men, believed to have been members of an international rugby team, on the March 18 flight from Los Angeles to New York. In the last hour of the flight, he had reacted violently when a flight attendant refused to serve him another beer, pushing her at one point. Before landing, he lost consciousness and was met on the runway by paramedics who took him to a local hospital where he was pronounced dead of what was later found to be a heart attack brought on by alcohol and cocaine.
- After Victoria Osteen, 47, wife of megachurch pastor Joel Osteen, boarded a December Continental flight in her hometown, Houston, for Vail, Colorado, she saw a spot of an unknown liquid on her seat's armrest and demanded to be moved. She reportedly shoved aside the first flight attendant she talked to, stating a preference to talk to the only one on board at the time who was white, and then forced her way into the cockpit before being escorted off the plane by police, with her husband and children following. The FAA fined her $3,000, but the attendant later sued her for assault.
- A 44-year-old passenger and his 28-year old fiancée, both of Luton, were sent back to Britain and arrested after their December 5 British Airways flight from Gatwick to Jamaica diverted to Bermuda to put them off. The couple, who appeared to some crew to have been intoxicated at the time they boarded the flight, reportedly consumed eight small wine bottles and two cans of beer between them. Before boarding, they argued loudly with the gate agent over their seats, and then once they boarded had another contentious dispute with a fellow passenger over how much space his bags had taken up. This relaxed them enough that they decided to have sex in the lavatory twice, by their account. On their third copulation, however, the noise attracted the attention of passengers and then crew, who later ordered them back to their seats. After attendants refused to serve them more alcohol, the couple became abusive and violent. Eventually the two were restrained and handcuffed. Upon their return to the UK they were charged with endangering the safety of an aircraft (later dropped) and being drunk during a flight. In 2007 they both pleaded guilty; the 44-year old received a three-month suspended sentence and 100 hours of community service while the 28-year old was sentenced to a year in prison. The judge also fined them the £6,000 they had been paid for their story by a newspaper.
- Monarch Airlines Flight 558: On a December 27 flight from Manchester to Tenerife in the Canary Islands, a 53-year-old male passenger became verbally abusive after being refused further drinks. When the man refused to calm down, the captain decided to divert to the small airport on Porto Santo Island in the Madeiras, where he put the passenger off, accompanied by his luggage, stacked next to him on the runway, to applause from the other passengers. Portuguese police decided not to arrest him after taking statements from him and the captain; however, Monarch banned him from flying with them indefinitely.

=== 2006 ===
- Thomsonfly Flight 437B: Shortly after the January 16 flight left Mexico for Birmingham, England, a passenger who had reportedly smuggled some hard liquor aboard in a Pepsi bottle began smashing the aircraft's toilets after he had had to wait to use them, eventually escalating to attempting to open the hatch door. When passengers and crew attempted to restrain him, he lashed out violently at some of them, screaming "You're all going to die! You'll never take me to Birmingham alive!" The captain decided to divert to Sanford Airport in Orlando, Florida, where the passenger was arrested by the FBI and all the other passengers were put up in a hotel for the night. The flight continued to the UK the next day.
- Thomas Cook Airlines Flight 313L: On a March flight from Antalya, Turkey, to Newcastle, a 53-year-old passenger from Darlington, who by his own account had not had the best time on holiday, became livid when told he could not use his Binns store card to pay for drinks on the plane. He called the flight attendant a "fucking wanker" and threw things at him. Later, he began smoking in defiance of the posted ban, and when asked to stop by the same flight attendant, crawled across the seats to strike the man in the face, causing injuries that required £2,000 of dental work to repair. The pilot diverted the plane to Frankfurt, where the penniless man had to eat leftover food from airport restaurants for two days until a charity funded a flight back to Britain for him. Eight months after his return, he was arrested and charged with endangering a flight crew and assault. In September 2007 he pleaded guilty and was sentenced to a year in prison. While the judge could not ban him from flying commercially after his release, Thomas Cook banned him from its planes for life.
- On April 26, rapper Snoop Dogg and five members of his entourage were thrown out of the British Airways VIP lounge at Heathrow because their tickets to Johannesburg were only economy class. Airline officials then barred them from the flight due to their rude behavior. They took out their frustrations at a nearby duty-free shop, where the police were called to remove them from the airport as well. In the ensuing confrontation several of the responding officers were injured, sometimes by bottles thrown at them; all six men were arrested. British authorities banned Snoop Dogg from entering the country for a tour the next year over the incident; however, in 2008 he was acquitted of all charges, when evidence showed he had had little to do with the mayhem, and the ban was lifted.
- A Swedish passenger became unruly on a May 12 British Airways flight from London to New York. She refused to take her seat, blocked aisles and food service, and became violent when crew attempted to restrain her, aided by another passenger, Manchester City full-back Danny Mills. The pilot diverted to Goose Bay in Labrador, where she was arrested by Canadian authorities. She pleaded guilty to charges of assault and endangering the safety of the flight; she was fined $10,000 and ordered to reimburse the airline the nearly $18,500 cost of the diversion as well.
- After a 28-year-old passenger from Wembley, England, drank some vodka he had smuggled aboard a June 1 Zoom Airlines flight from Glasgow to Ottawa, he accused a neighboring passenger of stealing some of his CDs. This escalated into an altercation so severe the pilot decided to return to Glasgow while the flight was halfway across the Atlantic, an action estimated to have cost the airline CDN$200,000. He pleaded guilty to disorderly conduct, breach of the peace and placing others in a state of fear; he was sentenced to 240 hours of community service.
- Rangers' midfielder Fernando Ricksen, 30, was sent home from the club's training camp in South Africa early in July by trainer Paul Le Guen after what was reported to be an alcohol-fueled argument with a flight attendant on the team's flight to Johannesburg. He sought treatment for alcohol dependency and anger management afterward and was loaned to Zenit St. Petersburg for the season; Zenit later signed him and he never played for Rangers again.
- China Airlines Flight 682: A 32-year old Vietnamese American was arrested after the flight to Los Angeles from Ho Chi Minh City diverted to Kaohsiung in Taiwan rather than its original stop at Taipei on July 19. The passenger had boarded the plane intoxicated and assaulted attendants and punched out the inner shell of his passenger window, prompting the pilot to send out an alert that the plane was being hijacked so that the passenger could be taken into custody. After finding medication used to treat mental illness among his belongings, authorities concluded he was mentally unstable when he broke the window.

=== 2007 ===
- A British Airways flight from London to Phoenix, Arizona, diverted to Winnipeg, Manitoba, on March 3 to allow Canadian authorities to arrest passenger David McAuliffe, 38, of Castleisland, Ireland. Nervous about the long flight due to a previous bad experience during a crash, he had combined alcohol and Valium in large quantities that day. However, he flew into a rage on the plane when denied an additional drink, requiring several passengers and crew to restrain him. He pleaded guilty to mischief and disobeying the orders of a flight crew, and was fined CDN$2,000 and ordered to reimburse the airline $15,000 in costs for the diversion. McAuliffe also told that court that his employer had rescinded the promotion that had prompted the flight and he was not sure if he could even retain his former position.
- John Michael Moody II, 43, of Wilton Manors, Florida, asked "Where's the gay section?" when he boarded a Southwest flight from Indianapolis to Jacksonville on June 12. He and two friends he was traveling with began consuming liquor they had brought in Moody's carry-on upon reaching their seats. After the flight was underway, Moody began repeatedly groping and propositioning a male flight attendant despite being asked to stop multiple times. After being rebuffed enough times, he let loose with a profane tirade against the attendant, who then reminded him there were children on the flight. Moody then picked up a nearby 7-year-old boy who had been waiting in line for the toilet, waved him around and said "You mean like this one?" He was arrested by federal air marshals after the plane landed and charged with interfering with a flight crew. He was later sentenced to four months in prison followed by two years of supervised release, ordered to undergo substance abuse counseling and disbarred as a consequence of the felony conviction.
- On that same day, Irish authorities handled another diverted flight. Scott Watson, 33, of Derbyshire, England, was taken into custody at Shannon after he had insulted and threatened attendants on the Thomas Cook flight he had taken back to Manchester from his recent nuptials in Cancun, Mexico. He pleaded guilty to three charges, and was sentenced to three months in prison and fined €500 after the court learned that he had seven previous criminal convictions in Britain.
- On September 11, three flights diverted into Shannon due to air rage incidents:
  - Martinair Flight 621: After departing Amsterdam for Cuba, Volodymyr and Irynn Litovkin, of Ukraine, aged 43 and 39, respectively, had to be forcibly returned to their seats; they were described as intoxicated. They were arrested upon arrival in Ireland. Both received one-month suspended sentences after pleading guilty; Volodymyr was additionally fined €700.
  - A Delta flight from Istanbul to New York diverted to Shannon after a passenger, described as an Iranian national, had to be restrained by air marshals on the plane. He was arrested, but charges were dropped when it was discovered he had simply been ill and become distressed; a day afterward he continued on to New York with the other passengers, who had been accommodated in local hotels overnight.
  - Lastly, a Thomas Cook charter flight from Manchester to Toronto landed at Shannon to put off a Pakistani passenger whose behavior was described as suspicious. He became ill as well after his arrest and was hospitalized; the passengers on this flight also spent the night in Shannon.

=== 2008 ===
- On March 1, a Delta flight from Atlanta to Dublin diverted to Bangor International Airport in Maine after Aiden Markle, 40, of Portadown, Northern Ireland, who may have been intoxicated on boarding and drank several small bottles of wine shortly after takeoff, became unruly two hours into the flight when a flight attendant confronted him over his attempt to smoke in a lavatory. When she informed the captain, he said he was an associate of Osama bin Laden and would bomb the plane. A deadheading Delta pilot attempted to calm him down, earning him a punch from Markle, whereupon he was restrained so the plane could land and deliver him to waiting FBI agents. After pleading guilty to interfering with a flight crew and assault, Markle was sentenced to 116 days in prison followed by two years of supervised release and ordered to pay the airline $20,000 in restitution for the diversion.
- Canadian children's entertainer Michael Roy Shick, 40, of Vancouver, was arrested on March 11 after a Zoom flight from Vancouver to Belfast. Early in the flight he had been seen spiking drinks with liquor from bottles he had brought on to the plane and taking pills, later determined to be anti-depressants and sleep aids. Midway through the flight he became verbally abusive, at one point spitting in a flight attendant's face. After pleading guilty to three counts of assault and one each of acting in a manner likely to endanger an aircraft, being drunk on an aircraft and criminal damage to an aircraft seat. He admitted having a drinking problem and was sentenced to a year in prison.
- After boarding her British Airways flight to Los Angeles at Heathrow on April 3, model Naomi Campbell, 37, was informed that one of the six bags she had checked had not been loaded because otherwise the plane would have been too heavy; she was given the choice of waiting for it to come on a later flight and taking a different connecting flight or having it forwarded to her. She at first appeared to choose the former, but then began verbally abusing the crew present, to the point that the pilot called police to remove her from the aircraft. As they did, she assaulted them; they arrested her on two counts of that offense. In June she pleaded guilty to the charges and was sentenced to 200 hours of community service. Her punishment also included paying £200 to one of the officers in compensation, £150 to the captain of the flight and a £2,300 fine. She claimed that she had been called a "Golliwog supermodel" by someone on the flight, inciting her later outburst; the airline's staff countered that, in their opinion, she was extremely drunk by the end of the flight.
- Thomas Cook Flight 573L: After a woman bit her male traveling companion in the face during an apparent lovers' quarrel on this May 15 flight from Hurghada to Manchester, the pilot diverted to Lyon–Saint-Exupéry Airport in France to have them taken off.
- JetBlue Flight 643: After her cigarettes and matches were confiscated while she was waiting for the lavatory on the June 17 flight from New York to San Francisco, Christina Szele, 35, of Woodside, Queens, New York City, who had a previous arrest record, returned to her seat and lit up there. When an African-American flight attendant asked her to stop, she responded by threatening him and using racial slurs. She punched another attendant, broke through a pair of plastic handcuffs, and constantly kicked the wall and stomped on the floor, requiring the presence of several crew to restrain her. The captain decided to divert to Denver, where she was taken off and arrested by the FBI on charges of interfering with a flight crew and assault. Szele claimed to have no memory of the incident and blamed the airline for serving her three vodka tonics. A few months after her indictment, her bond was revoked after she was charged with assault again in New York and twice tested positive for cocaine use; as a result she served four months in jail before pleading guilty. She was ordered to attend anger management classes, seek treatment for alcohol and drug dependency, pay nearly $8,000 in restitution as well as a ban on flying commercially during five years' probation, which she violated in 2009 when she was arrested again for assault after a fight with her sister.
- A June 22 Aer Lingus flight from Dublin to Burgas, Bulgaria, had to cancel its takeoff and return to the gate due to fighting amongst the passengers. Police met the plane at the gate; two passengers and their luggage were taken off. The flight departed two hours later.
- On June 26, a Thomson flight from Sharm El Sheikh accelerated to its landing in Cardiff so Gareth Jackson, 34, of Bedwas, could be taken into custody. After consuming 11 beers and 250 ml of vodka in the airport, he went on a violent rampage when cabin crew refused to serve him further, kicking at chairs and breaking some of the plane's inner windows. Crew and passengers worked together to restrain him after he broke several sets of plastic handcuffs; the captain considered diverting to Venice. Jackson pleaded guilty to drunkenness on an aircraft and interfering with a plane crew; he was sentenced to eight months in prison.
- An XL Airways UK flight from the Greek island of Kos to Manchester had to divert to Frankfurt on July 23 to put two passengers off. Leanne Connor, 27, and Lynette Cooper, 26, both of Salford, who appeared to have boarded the plane already drunk, became abusive after being refused further drinks by the crew. They smoked in the lavatory, became physically abusive and then attempted to open the cabin door, leading passengers to restrain them. German police released them later to make their own way back to the UK, and the collapse of XL's British subsidiary a couple of months later made it seem as if they had escaped criminal charges. However, after the case was referred to the Greater Manchester Police, charges were filed, and XL's parent company announced that it intended to recover the £16,000 cost of the diversion through legal action.
- Jeswan Gupta Ramjee Teli, 45, of Singapore, was arrested when he arrived there on a September 5 Qantas flight from Perth. After a flight attendant several times refused his request for a fifth wine shortly before landing, he assaulted the man. Jeswan pleaded guilty to behaving in a drunk manner and was fined SG$800; he also paid the attendant $6,000 in compensation.
- JetBlue Flight 455. On September 6, the flight from Boston to Fort Lauderdale, already delayed 2 hours, diverted to Raleigh–Durham International Airport in North Carolina after a fight broke out on board, supposedly after a man became angry that his brother was smoking. After FBI agents held the flight for two hours to interview passengers, one person was taken into custody; several others were treated for their injuries.
- Air France Flight 8: Mathias Guerrand-Hermès, 36, of Paris, an heir to the fashion house of that name, was arrested after the October 14 flight from his hometown to New York. When the captain had entered the first-class section during the flight to ask that he respect a female passenger's wishes to be left alone, Guerrand-Hermès shouted "I am not going to behave!" and grabbed the captain's crotch. Several passengers and crew had to restrain him; court papers charging him with interfering with a flight crew noted that in addition to alcohol he had taken some prescription Propofan.
- An October 15 Monarch flight to Málaga returned to Gatwick shortly after takeoff in order to have Robert Russell, 48, of Crawley, taken off and arrested. Crew said he had smelled of alcohol on boarding, after consuming several pints of beer and several vodka shots in the departure lounge. Within the first 15 minutes of flight he reacted angrily when a flight attendant rebuffed his advances, leaving his seat to attempt to open the cabin door with the aircraft at 30,000 feet; he was restrained by passengers and crew. After he was convicted of offences related to the incident, a judge sentenced him to 200 hours' community service, suspended a 12-month jail term for two years, fined him £4,643 and banned him from every airport in the UK for five years.
- Thomson Airways Flight 133: The December 31 flight from Manchester to the Dominican Republic was delayed in taking off for three hours, allowing many passengers extra time to consume more alcohol. Early in the flight Grant Smith, 36, of Burnley, demanded food from a flight attendant after returning his wallet, which other passengers had been playing keep away with. Back at his seat, he argued loudly with a traveling companion, leading crew to issue him two formal written warning letters, both of which he tore up; he later called the flight attendant a "poof" and was heard standing next to a door saying he might kill someone. The flight had to divert to Bermuda, where Smith and six other passengers were taken off. He was arrested and charged with drunkenness on a plane and interfering with a flight crew. The latter charge was dropped in exchange for a guilty plea to the former; Smith was sentenced to 10½ months in prison.

=== 2009 ===
- On a February flight from London's Stansted Airport to Belfast, William George Moffitt, 46, of Derry, grew angry and refused to calm down despite repeated exhortations to do so by crew. He claimed at various times to be a member of the Ulster Volunteer Force and the Royal Ulster Constabulary. After being arrested after landing, Moffitt said he had been drinking heavily since that morning and had no memory of the incident. He pleaded guilty to behaving in a threatening manner on an aircraft and received a three-month sentence, suspended for 18 months.
- A March 31 Air Canada flight from London to Toronto that diverted to St. John's International Airport in Newfoundland and Labrador for a passenger's medical emergency also put off Colleen Walsh, 48, a former Rogers TV hostess from Toronto, while it was on the runway. She had refused to return to her seat when crew declined her offer of assistance to the afflicted passenger and became verbally abusive and disruptive, assaulting a fellow passenger in the process. Walsh later blamed the episode on a combination of wine, sleep deprivation and hormone replacement therapy. A provincial court eventually convicted her of assault and failing to obey instructions from a flight crew; she was fined $2,500 and given a year of probation. The judge also ordered her to remove disparaging remarks about the assaulted passenger from her blog and replace it with an apology to him.
- Kingfisher Airlines Flight 1: Three passengers on this April 5 flight from Bangalore were arrested on arrival at Heathrow. A 30-year-old woman from Fulham apparently engaged in sexual activity with a male passenger seated behind her while the two shared three bottles of wine, allowing him to fondle her breasts while she sat on his lap, and lifting her skirt to expose her underwear while changing into pants. Prior to that activity she had been asleep, allowing her young son to roam the cabin naked; crew took it upon themselves to put clean diapers on him. When the man's girlfriend, sleeping next to him, was awakened by crew herself, she learned what happened and grew verbally abusive. The Fulham woman also became angry when the crew declined to serve her further alcohol, at one point throwing her son's dirty diaper at attendants. Charges against the girlfriend were later dropped; the other two were charged with gross indecency. After the woman was acquitted when she demonstrated that the sexual conduct had not taken place in British airspace, the man changed his plea from guilty to not guilty; the crown decided not to formally prosecute the case, leaving the court to acquit him as well.
- Russian-born artist Galina Rusanova, 45, of London, was arrested by FBI agents in Bangor on April 29 after the United flight she had boarded in Los Angeles diverted there on its way to London. After having consumed prescription pills and wine prior to the flight, complemented by several small wine bottles and a prescription antidepressant after takeoff, all to deal with her anxieties about flying, she at one point kicked the seat in front of her when she returned from a trip to the bathroom. She fell asleep briefly, then upon waking began wandering around the cabin, babbling and bothering other passengers. After a flight attendant observed her drinking a bottle of hand soap from the lavatory, the crew attempted to return her to her seat; she began resisting violently, at one point getting down on all fours, making barking noises and attempting to bite one attendant on the leg. "It's typical of me," she told the agents who arrested her, when they informed her of the behavior she claimed to have no memory of. "I sometimes do crazy things." After being held in a local psychiatric hospital overnight for observation, she pleaded guilty to one count of assault and was sentenced to the three weeks' time served before her plea.
- US Airways Flight 705: About halfway through the June 30 flight from Charlotte, North Carolina, to Los Angeles, Keith Wright, 50, of the Bronx, New York, took all his clothes off. When a flight attendant attempted to cover him with a blanket, he assaulted her. The plane had to divert to Albuquerque International Sunport in New Mexico for another passenger's medical emergency, and crew took advantage of that detour to have Wright arrested by FBI agents as well. He said he had bipolar disorder and had forgotten to take his medication.
- EasyJet Flight 6877: Colin Coats, 40, of Glasgow, had already been moved to the rear of the plane by crew after striking a fellow passenger, whom he had accused of an undue interest in his girlfriend, on the September 15 flight from that city to Alicante. Roughly 45 minutes prior to landing, after being informed that Spanish police would be waiting for him, he began loudly berating and threatening other passengers, telling them he would burn their houses down, throw acid in their eyes and kill their children. He threatened to kill a flight attendant if police boarded, and savagely attacked the man when they did. Although EasyJet banned Coats for life, and he had a prior record as a violent criminal, Spanish authorities released him without charge, allowing him to remain in his nearby villa. He was eventually returned to Britain and faced trial, where he argued that he may have been given a drink spiked with LSD earlier that day, a defence that failed to prevent his conviction for threatening passengers and assaulting a crew member. Coats was fined £2,000; the judge told him that he had avoided prison time only because those offences had taken place after the plane landed.
- After consuming a bottle of Tia Maria liqueur on a September 24 Jet2 flight from Mallorca, Cheryl Sweeney, 42, of North Shore, Blackpool, was refused further alcoholic beverage service by flight attendants due to her intoxication. She responded by verbally abusing them, causing the captain to come and warn her that if she did not calm down, he would consider diverting the flight to Bordeaux–Mérignac Airport in France to have her taken off, arrested, and billed for the cost of the detour. Sweeney told him to go ahead and do it, and followed him to the cockpit door, saying she did not care about the cost since she had more than a dozen houses. She then returned to her seat and fell asleep. When she was awakened by the police who arrested her upon landing at Blackpool, however, she resumed her previous behavior, kicking one of them and calling the other by a racial slur. She later pleaded guilty to a charge of drunkenness on an aircraft, saying her actions were due to her partner's abusive behavior during their holiday, and was given a suspended sentence.
- Air India Flight 884: While the October 3 flight from Sharjah to Delhi was over Pakistan, a fight broke out between the pilots and members of the cabin crew, purportedly over allegations the former had sexually harassed a flight attendant who had entered the cockpit; the pilots claimed the incident was fabricated by the attendants to protect the purser, who had been "misbehaving" and compromising flight safety, from action that would adversely affect his own private pilot's license. According to some reports the plane was briefly unmanned; the pilot threatened to divert to Karachi. After the plane landed, the airline grounded all staff involved pending an internal investigation; crew involved filed police complaints against each other
- A November 12 Thai Airways flight from Bangkok to Heathrow had an unruly passenger arrested after landing. Within three hours of taking off James Green, 31, had consumed so much alcohol that, based on tests after the flight, he was estimated to have a blood alcohol content by then more than five times the legal limit for driving under English law. Flight attendants refused to serve him further, whereupon he went on a violent rampage in the cabin, emptying all the lavatory refuse bins on the floor, attempting to open the cabin door and assaulting crew and passengers until he could be restrained; he fell asleep afterwards and told police he had no memory of the incident, suggesting he should be released because he had apologized. Following Green's guilty pleas to several charges, an 11-month prison sentence was suspended for two years, but he was nevertheless fined £4,800.
- US Airways Flight 728: John Alexander Murray, 50, of Glasgow, began arguing with crew shortly after takeoff from Philadelphia on November 16. Attendants had asked him to move his arm, in a splint due to a recent injury, out of the aisle so they could push a drinks cart past; he refused to, saying his doctor had told him to keep it stretched. After repeated requests left Murray even more obstinate, at one point demanding to return to Philadelphia, the pilot decided to divert to Boston so Murray could be taken off. He was arrested and charged with interfering with a flight crew; after two hours the plane continued to London.
- Air Canada Flight 872: Shortly after takeoff from Toronto on December 30, the Frankfurt-bound flight had to divert to Montréal–Pierre Elliott Trudeau International Airport so Khodar Ahmad, 31, of Toronto, could be escorted off the plane after he and his seatmate had fought over their elbow room. The other passenger declined to press charges; however, Ahmad became sufficiently belligerent at the airline's ticket counter in his attempts to either get reimbursed for his ticket or for ground transportation back to Toronto that he was arrested and charged with disturbing the peace. After his guilty plea the next morning he was sentenced to 30 days in jail.

== 2010s ==
=== 2010 ===
- As a January 6, 2010, Northwest flight for Detroit was taxiing out to the runway at Miami International Airport, Manor Mohammed Asad, 43, of Toledo, Ohio, stood up and shouted "I am a Palestinian and I want to kill all the Jews!" The plane returned to the gate, where Asad was taken off by three police officers, whom he suggested he might seriously injure and accused of racism. He was arrested and eventually pleaded guilty to criminal mischief, disorderly conduct, resisting arrest without violence and threatening a public servant; his family said he had suffered from bipolar disorder in the past. He was sentenced to three years' probation, during which he could not fly or use rail-based mass transit, and ordered to pay the airline $27,500 in restitution.
- Delta Air Lines Flight 83: After drinking a miniature vodka bottle and a liter of Bailey's Irish Cream on the January 8, 2010, flight from Nice to New York, Franck Lebrun, 34, of Isola, France, went into the lavatory to smoke. Passengers noticed and informed crew. When a flight attendant asked him to stop, Lebrun burst out of the lavatory and attacked her. He remained violent and defiant even after being confronted by three federal air marshals on board. They arrested him on a charge of assaulting a flight crew member; Lebrun later pleaded guilty and was sentenced to the six days' time served, put on probation for six months and fined $500.
- On an April 2010 Delta flight from Atlanta to New York, Kim Goodwine, 38, of Georgia, who was not pregnant at the time but appeared to crew to be intoxicated, sat in a seat reserved for a pregnant woman and refused to move. She eventually began to resist physically, biting the hand of a traveling FBI agent who intervened. Goodwine was arrested on landing and charged with assault; during the pendency of her case her bail was revoked when she was arrested for missing a court appearance in Georgia following an arrest on charges of vandalizing her boyfriend's car. After three months, she was sentenced to five years' probation.
- Delta Air Lines Flight 79: Fifteen minutes after takeoff from Berlin on April 10, 2010, Bert Niepel, 51, of Berlin, decided to sit in first class despite having an economy-class ticket, believing he deserved an upgrade. He refused repeated requests from crew to move back to his assigned seat, and eventually assaulted a flight attendant. After that, the crew locked the cockpit door, had a passenger who was an off-duty German marine sit next to him and diverted the New York-bound flight to Manchester, where Niepel was taken off and arrested; he complained he had stomach pains and the larger seat was the only way to ameliorate them. Within a week he pleaded guilty to behaving in a threatening, abusive, insulting or disorderly manner towards a flight crew and was fined £1,000 plus £70 in costs.
- A June 10, 2010, Lufthansa flight from Mexico City to Frankfurt diverted to Canada after Olaf Sverri Peterson, 45, of the Faroe Islands, became enraged after allegedly consuming liquor he had smuggled aboard the plane. In addition to becoming verbally abusive, Peterson also allegedly urinated in the aisle. Upon landing in Newfoundland and Labrador he was charged with engaging in behavior that endangered a plane in flight, public disturbance, public indecency and interfering with the lawful use of public property; after his arrest the plane continued to Germany.
- One hour into a July 6, 2010, WestJet flight from Calgary to Halifax, Barbara Morton, 47, of St. John's, Newfoundland, left her seat and told a flight attendant she was experiencing morphine withdrawal and was going to open the cabin door. Passengers and crew joined to restrain her from doing so and then secured her to her seat with cable ties; Morton assaulted two of them while doing so. The pilot diverted to Winnipeg James Armstrong Richardson International Airport where police took her into custody and charged her with criminal mischief and disobeying the instructions of a flight crew; police learned she suffered from panic attacks and took prescription OxyContin. Morton, already on probation for an assault conviction in her native province, part of her lengthy criminal record there, pleaded guilty and was sentenced to two months in jail plus three years' unsupervised probation during which she could only fly with permission from a doctor, except on WestJet as that airline had banned her for life following the incident. She also was fined CDN$6,202 and ordered to undergo drug counseling.
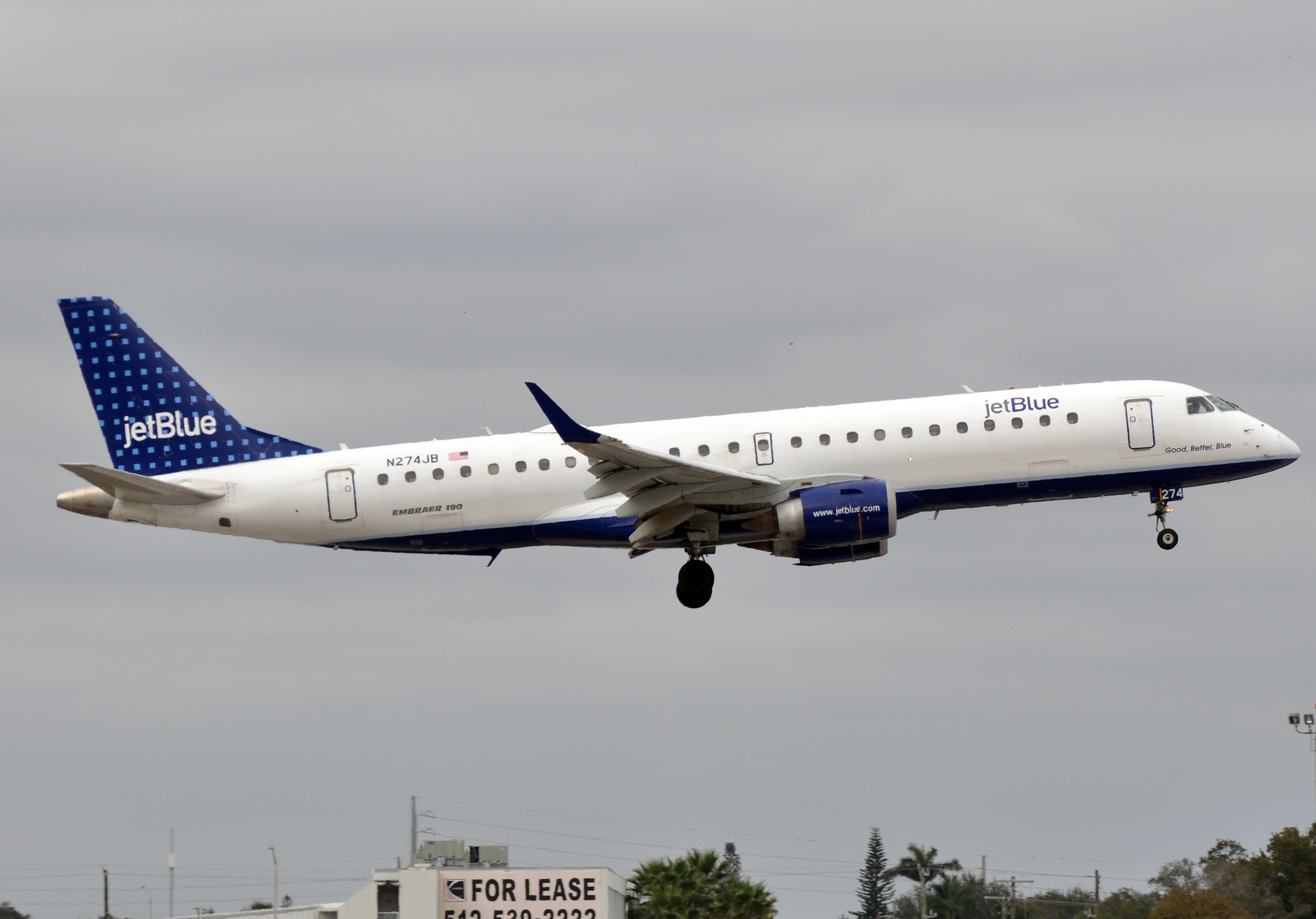
- JetBlue Airways Flight 1052
  JetBlue Airways Flight 1052: After the August 9, 2010, flight from Pittsburgh had landed at New York's Kennedy Airport, flight attendant Steven Slater, 39, of Belle Harbor, Queens, New York, got on the public-address system and launched into a verbal tirade against the passengers, telling them they could "go fuck themselves" and then, after grabbing two bottles of beer, announced he was quitting his job after nearly 20 years in the industry, activated the evacuation slide and left the plane. Later he claimed his actions had been a response to a passenger swearing at him after Slater had asked for an apology after her bag fell on his head when she was removing it from the overhead luggage compartment while the plane was taxiing to the gate despite Slater's repeated admonitions to her to remain seated per air safety regulations; however, no other passenger or crew member recalls this. Slater was arrested later that day and charged under New York law with criminal mischief, reckless endangerment, and criminal trespass. Despite the charges, he was celebrated on social media as a folk hero who realized the common fantasy of quitting an unfulfilling job in a flashy manner. He later attributed his actions to the combined effect of overwork, drug and alcohol abuse and the stress of caring for a sick mother. He then pleaded guilty to a reduced charge and was sentenced to probation and ordered to undergo counseling and submit to drug testing; he was also ordered to reimburse JetBlue the $25,000 in costs it incurred replacing the slide and keeping the Embraer 190 out of service until its inspection by the FAA.
- An October 22, 2010, Virgin Atlantic flight from Florida to England diverted to Newfoundland so passenger Roy Heaps, 44, could be arrested. After consuming beer and vodka to alleviate his fear of flying, he assaulted his wife and other family members traveling with him. Heaps pleaded guilty to assault, uttering threats, mischief and interfering with the performance of a flight crew. He was sentenced to time served, fined CAN$10,500 and ordered to pay $13,267 in restitution to the airline.
- A November 5, 2010, Thomson Airlines flight had to divert to Bermuda after Carol Close, 45, of Lytham, England, became unruly. She had had a pint of lager and two rums during a lengthy delay at Manchester Airport before takeoff, as well as some prescription anti-depressants and painkillers. Halfway through the flight's intended course to the Dominican Republic, she began striking her husband, who was sitting next to her. Nearby passengers alerted crew, who separated the two. Later, however, Close left her seat to resume the dispute, leading crew to move adjacent passengers as well. The pilot ordered her put in restraints, and she assaulted one of the flight attendants doing so. They were removed after she calmed down, but then reinstalled after she once again became verbally abusive, whereupon the flight diverted to have her taken off, to passenger applause. Close was returned to Britain to stand trial; she pleaded guilty to two charges of assault and one of affray. She received a six-month suspended sentence, a two-month curfew and was ordered to pay £2,476 in costs to the airline and £200 each to the two crew members she assaulted.
- An EasyJet flight from Athens had to abort its initial landing at Manchester on December 7, 2010, after Lynn Grimes, 41, a British national who spent most of her year working in Greece, refused to return to her seat and assaulted a passenger and flight attendant who tried to get her to do so. After a second, successful landing, Grimes was escorted off the plane by two passengers and handed over to police, who arrested her on two counts of assault and one of endangering the crew of an aircraft. Diagnosed with fear of flying and facing a court summons that would soon require her return to Greece, Grimes had run low on the prescription Valium that had helped her on the flight to Greece and attempted to compensate with alcohol, adding four airline wine bottles to what she had already drunk before boarding. The court took her psychological issues into consideration, suspending an eight-month prison sentence for 18 months but requiring 60 hours of community service and that she participate in further treatment for her flight phobia.
- As a December 28, 2010, Southwest flight was waiting to take off from Boise Airport in Idaho, Russell Miller, 68, punched a teenager seated next to him who had refused to turn off his iPhone despite repeated instructions from flight attendants to do so. Miller claimed it was just a tap, but several other passengers disagreed and the blow reportedly caused a bruise. The plane returned to the gate, where police arrested him. He eventually pleaded guilty to battery and was sentenced to 60 days in jail, all but three of which were suspended, and assessed $275 in fines and court costs.

=== 2011 ===
- A hundred Belgian students were removed from a Ryanair flight to Brussels before it left Lanzarote Airport in Spain's Canary Islands on February 5, 2011. Some of the students, part of a group tour, were angry at having to pay extra fees for their hand luggage, and grew abusive with staff; when the Guardia Civil were called in to remove them, other students began complaining and some even left as a show of solidarity with them. No charges were brought and the students left for home on later flights.
- Virgin Atlantic Flight 69: A man and a woman began fighting, reportedly after she rebuffed his drunken sexual advances, on a May 2, 2011, Virgin Atlantic flight from London to Kingston, Jamaica; other passengers traveling with them joined in. Before they could be restrained about £25,000 worth of damage was done to the aircraft interior. Upon landing they were both arrested; prosecutors dropped charges against the woman after they were unable to find sufficient evidence that she had started the fight. However, the man, Jason Dixon, 32, of London, pleaded guilty to malicious destruction of property and passenger unruliness. He was given the choice between J$150,000 in fines or nine months in jail, with deportation after completion of sentence.
- A May 11, 2011, EasyJet flight from Kraków to Edinburgh diverted to Amsterdam after a man on board was restrained by crew when he attempted to open the cabin door. He was taken off the plane for observation.
- Virgin Atlantic Flight 29: As the June 9, 2011, flight from Gatwick approached Barbados, a brawl broke out aboard the plane when one traveling family complained about the noise made by another, who were celebrating one member's birthday with ample amounts of drink. Martin and Zoe King, both 49, reacted by throwing coffee at the other family, followed by blows. After crew tried for an hour to get the situation under control, the pilot ordered all in the cabin back into their seats and asked police to meet the flight upon arrival. The Kings, as well as Zoe's father Derek Edmonds, 76, all of London, were arrested and charged with causing disruption on a plane. A Barbadian court fined them £2,300 each upon their guilty pleas; the airline banned them for life.
- United Airlines Flight 990: Shortly after taking off from Dulles for Ghana on May 29, 2011, two passengers apparently began fighting over one's decision to recline his seat into the other's knees. Since the pilot was not sure at the time that the altercation was not related to a possible attempt to hijack the plane, he made the decision to return to Washington. Two U.S. Air Force F-16 fighters from Andrews Air Force Base escorted the plane as it circled the airport for 25 minutes to burn off sufficient fuel to land; upon doing so the passengers were taken off the plane but not charged.
- Air France Flight 5010: On August 16, 2011, some minutes before the plane was due to take off from Paris, bound for Dublin, French actor Gérard Depardieu urinated into an empty bottle and onto the carpet, as the bathroom was unavailable. He was removed from the flight and later apologized for the incident.
- An Austrian Airlines flight from Washington to Vienna diverted to Shannon Airport on August 20, 2011, to have an unruly passenger arrested by the Garda Síochána. Harold Albrecht, 32, of Austria, was charged with threatening people aboard the aircraft and drunkenness. He was fined €400; the airline indicated its intent to sue him for the much greater costs it incurred from the diversion.
- JetBlue Flight 1732: Shortly after taking off from L.F. Wade International Airport in Bermuda for New York on October 9, 2011, the plane returned to have an American woman taken off due to her disruptive behavior; she had also been reported to be behaving erratically at a local travel agency earlier that day. She was held for psychiatric observation.
- On October 25, 2011, Byron Pinksen, 41, of Grande Prairie, Alberta, became loud and disruptive on an Air Canada flight from Edmonton to Toronto and refused crew exhortations to calm down. Flight attendants noticed that he was consuming vodka he had brought on board and attempted to confiscate it. In the course of resisting those attempts Pinksen allegedly assaulted a crew member, and then lit a cigarette. The pilot then chose to divert to Winnipeg, where Pinksen was arrested on six charges related to the incident. He was released on bail pending trial but banned from flying Air Canada.

=== 2012 ===
- Delta Air Lines Flight 414: After taking off from Atlanta, the January 15, 2012, flight diverted to Tampa International Airport so a German couple in first class could be put off. Crew claimed they had refused to return to their seats during takeoff when told there was no champagne available. The couple confirmed to the media later that they had complained about the food and beverage service, but had never left their seats and did not become abusive. After questioning by the FBI, no charges were filed, and the flight continued to Costa Rica.
- Thomas Cook Flight 2014: Less than an hour after taking off for Fuerteventura in mid-January 2012, the plane returned to Manchester after two passengers, who appeared to be father and son, began fighting; both appeared to have been drinking and were restrained by other passengers. Upon landing the two were taken into custody; no charges were brought against the older man.
- Two months later, another Thomas Cook flight bound for the Canary Islands returned to Manchester shortly after takeoff. This one, bound for Tenerife, put off John Hawkins, 32, of Newton-le-Willows, who was arrested for his disruptive behavior after a fellow passenger asked him to mind his language in the presence of children, some of whom were his own, accompanying him. When male flight attendants attempted to intervene, Hawkins directed homophobic slurs at them; eventually he had to be restrained. After pleading guilty to endangering an aircraft following his return to Britain, he attributed his behaviour to the effects of alcohol combined with painkillers he was prescribed after a 1999 car accident that seriously disabled him. Taking into account a prior criminal history, the judge sentenced him to eight months in jail. Four years later, on another holiday flight from Spain, Hawkins engaged in similar behavior and was again prosecuted, that time pleading not guilty and receiving a fine and sentence after conviction.
- American Airlines Flight 2232: As the March 9, 2012, flight to Chicago was taxiing from the gate at Dallas/Fort Worth International Airport, a flight attendant began telling passengers that the plane would have to return to the gate, then began discussing bankruptcy, her career with the airline, and saying she would not be responsible for the plane crashing, in a mixture of Spanish and English. A fellow attendant attempted to calm her down, but she was shouted down. Finally two passengers, another flight attendant and a deadheading pilot were able to forcibly restrain her in a seat so the plane could return to the gate; the first flight attendant, who blamed the episode on her bipolar disorder, was taken to the hospital for observation while the coworker who had helped restrain her suffered a broken wrist. No charges were filed.
- JetBlue Flight 191: During the March 27, 2012, flight from New York to Las Vegas, pilot Clayton Osbon, 49, of Savannah, Georgia, began making bizarre statements to his copilot about needing to take a leap of faith, not being able to make it to Vegas and not wanting to be held responsible for the plane crashing. During bathroom breaks in the cabin, he similarly alarmed passengers by telling them to "Say your prayers ... We're all going down!" The copilot managed to lure him from the cockpit and lock him out; a deadheading captain replaced Osbon and helped the plane divert to Rick Husband Amarillo International Airport in Texas. In the cabin, Osbon ran up and down the aisles ranting loudly about Jesus, al-Qaeda and the possibility of a bomb on board. Fearful passengers subdued him and restrained him with seat belt extenders. After landing safely, Osbon was taken into custody, arrested and charged with interference with a flight crew. He was suspended indefinitely by the airline. At trial four months later, he was found not guilty by reason of insanity and committed to a low-security federal prison until he could be treated sufficiently; shortly afterwards he was released to continue his treatment as an outpatient under the supervision of a probation officer.
- Cathay Pacific Flight 712: On an April 16 flight from Bangkok to Hong Kong, a Filipino passenger assaulted two flight attendants before he was subdued by the cabin crew as well as other passengers. He was arrested after the plane landed without diversion. The attendants were taken to the hospital for minor injuries and released the same day. There have been media reports in Mongolia hailing one of its passengers as a hero thwarting a terrorist attack, but the airline as well as other third-party reports have contradicted this.
- Varinder Sood, 39, of Grand Valley, Ontario, was taken off a Jet Airways flight from Toronto to Brussels at Gander, Newfoundland, on June 2, 2012. After being refused further drinks while aboard he had become verbally abusive to crew and attempted to enter the cockpit. He was charged with mischief, causing a disturbance and interfering with the flight of an aircraft.
- Qantas Jetconnect Flight 37: Bound for Wellington, New Zealand, the plane returned to Melbourne on June 2, 2012, after Frances Macaskill, 58, a New Zealand citizen who lived in Western Australia, became drunk and agitated, striking several passengers and causing a severe facial abrasion to one of them. After being restrained she continued to headbutt the seat in front of her. Macaskill was arrested and charged with assault, failure to follow instructions on an aircraft and offensive behaviour on an aircraft; she pleaded guilty to assault and disorderly behaviour. After learning that she had been convicted and fined AUS$110 for similar behavior a year prior on another flight, the judge fined her $3,500, ordered her to repay the airline the $18,245 it incurred as a result of her actions, and suspended a four-month jail sentence. Qantas banned her from flying on it or any of its subsidiaries for at least 10 years.
- United Airlines Flight 24: After arriving at Shannon from Newark on August 19, 2012, Irish police arrested Stephen Herrick, 40, of Houston. He had consumed a prescription Ambien sleeping pill in addition to alcohol before the flight, and consequently became disruptive during it, refusing to follow crew directions and being so verbally abusive and otherwise disruptive that he had to be handcuffed to his seat. Herrick pleaded guilty to drunkenness aboard an aircraft and two other charges. He was ordered to donate €500 to charity.
- An Air Canada flight from London, UK to Calgary diverted to Edmonton on August 20, 2012, to put off Justin Neil Frank, 35, of Calgary. He had appeared to be intoxicated when boarding, and continued to drink during the flight, apparently from liquor he had brought himself. A female passenger seated near him said he propositioned her three hours into the flight. Later on he attempted to procure his own drinks from the cart and became verbally abusive, requiring passengers to restrain him. Upon landing he was arrested by the Royal Canadian Mounted Police and charged with sexual assault, mischief causing a disturbance, consuming alcohol that wasn't served on an aircraft and failure to comply with the instructions of a flight crew member.
- On an August 28, 2012, Air Canada flight from Halifax to Saskatoon, Canadian Senator Rod Zimmer, 69, and his wife Maygan Sensenberger, 23, were believed by crew to have gotten into a domestic argument. They claimed that at one point she said she would slit his throat and bring down the plane. Both were arrested on landing. Sensenberger explained that she had been concerned for his health as he had complained of tightness in his chest and that was what the two were arguing about. She claimed that the argument was calmer than the crew reported. Eventually charges against Zimmer were dropped. Sensenberger pleaded guilty to one count of causing a disturbance on an aircraft. She received a one-year suspended sentence and probation.
- Swiss International Air Lines Flight 196: Four hours after leaving for Beijing on September 2, 2012, after the plane overflew Moscow, a fight broke out between two intoxicated men, both Chinese nationals, that had started over a reclined seat. Flight attendants and other passengers managed to quell the brawl after the chief attendant was assaulted in his attempt to separate them. Russian authorities refused permission to divert during the time to Sheremetyevo International Airport due to visa concerns, so the pilot decided to return to Zürich. The men were arrested by cantonal police. The airline put all the passengers up in hotels for the night and indicated it would consider suing the two to recover the costs of the return to Zürich.
- A September 3, 2012, JetBlue flight from Boston to Los Angeles diverted to Bergstrom International Airport in Austin, Texas, to put off Wes Scantlin, 40, onetime lead singer of the band Puddle of Mudd. He had allegedly gotten verbally abusive with a flight attendant who refused to serve him further beer (he claimed he had not had any until that point). Scantlin was charged with public intoxication, a charge later dropped for lack of evidence. Other passengers on the flight received a $50 voucher from the airline and an apology for the delay.
- On December 18, 2012, a Tokyo-bound Qantas flight from Sydney diverted to Cairns Airport in Queensland shortly after takeoff so a 34-year-old Perth man could be arrested. Having boarded the plane already heavily intoxicated, he attempted to smoke. After being warned not to, he became violent, punching crew and spitting at them. He was charged with smoking in an aircraft, behaving in a disorderly and offensive manner on board an aircraft and interfering with crew or aircraft.
- A British Airways flight from New York to London diverted to Shannon on December 19, 2012, to have one passenger, an Australian national living in New York, arrested. After taking Ambien and Xanax prior to boarding, the passenger had consumed four small bottles of wine, then grown verbally and physically abusive, attempting to head butt the captain. The passenger pleaded guilty to two charges and was ordered to make a €1,000 charitable contribution in addition to the €3,367 reimbursement he owed the airline.

=== 2013 ===
- After an Icelandic man aboard a January 4, 2013, Icelandair flight from Reykjavík to New York consumed an entire bottle of duty-free liquor, he grew disruptive, assaulting a woman seated next to him and shouting that the plane was going to crash. Passengers restrained him by using duct tape and cable ties to fasten him to his seat. A photo of him bound and gagged with the former went viral on social media, as well as some video taken afterwards. Upon landing at Kennedy Airport he was taken to a nearby hospital. No charges were filed.
- On January 11, 2013, Sergei Kabalov from Saratov, Russia, started an altercation with another passenger while on Metrojet flight from Moscow to Hurghada, Egypt, with his wife and a 3-year-old daughter. After drinking heavily in economy class, he tried to use a lavatory in business class, stating that the bathroom line in economy class was too long. After being refused entry by flight attendant, he hit him in the head several times. After that Kabalov started smoking in the cabin, physically assaulted several other flight attendants, then tried to break into the pilot's cabin threatening to kill everyone on board, and to land a plane on water. He also proclaimed himself a member of GRU special forces and a member of Russian State Duma, which turned out to be untrue. He was later arrested in Belarus and sentenced to three and a half years in prison for battery and attempted hijacking of an airplane.
- A protest occurred at Kunming Changshui International Airport in February 2013, when 50 angry passengers from a canceled flight stormed several gates in an attempt to prevent other travelers from boarding those flights. Police broke up the protest using pepper spray.
- A Canadian family from Cape Breton Island was arrested after being put off a February 1, 2013, Sunwing Airlines flight from Halifax to the Dominican Republic that had diverted to Bermuda due to an altercation between them and the crew. The fight began when one of the family allegedly was caught smoking. They were charged with disobeying orders of a flight crew. David McNeil, 54, pleaded guilty to behaving in a disorderly manner and using abusive and insulting words while his wife Darlene, 52, pleaded guilty to disobeying lawful commands. Charges against their son were dropped. The couple were given the choice of serving 10 days in jail or paying a $500 fine.
- Delta Flight 721: On February 8, 2013, during final descent of a flight from Minneapolis to Hartsfield-Jackson Atlanta International Airport, a 19-month-old boy experienced pain from the change in altitude and began to cry. Joe Rickey Hundley, 61, of Hayden, Idaho was seated next to the boy, and demanded his mother quiet the boy, used a racial slur, then slapped the boy on the face. He was arrested at the terminal. Hundley's lawyer stated that he was grieving after the death of his son the previous day and he later pleaded guilty and was sentenced to eight months in prison for simple assault of a person under 16.
- In late February 2013, Yan Linkun, of Yunnan, arrived late at a Kunming Changshui gate for a flight to Guangzhou he had booked. He made a reservation for the next plane out, and left for breakfast with his wife. After they returned he found he had missed the second flight. Yan then grew angry and smashed computers and telephones at the gate agent's desk, which he then tried to kick in. Security camera video of the incident went viral on the Internet, first in China then globally. Despite publicly apologizing he lost both his job and a government position. Several months later, he was sentenced to six months in jail and a one-year suspended sentence.
- Hong Kong Airlines Flight 162: After the March 21, 2013, flight to Hong Kong had been waiting on the tarmac at Hainan Island's Sanya Phoenix International Airport for six hours, an elderly passenger began to angrily berate and attack a flight attendant, to applause from some of the passengers. Another passenger ended the attack by calming the man down and returning to his seat. The airline did not have him removed from the plane or arrested.
- Alaska Airlines Flight 132: As the flight from Anchorage descended into Portland International Airport on May 27, 2013, passenger Alexander Michael Herrera, 23, of Rio Rico, Arizona, asked the woman next to him what she might do if he tried to open the door. He then got up to do it, whereupon several other passengers restrained him. Upon landing Herrera was arrested and charged with interfering with a flight crew. He said in court later that he was bipolar, and had not taken any medication for his condition in over a year. In 2014 he pleaded guilty and was sentenced to three years' probation.
- After a flight at China's Nanchang Changbei International Airport had been delayed for seven hours on July 18, 2013, due to weather, a group of at least 30 passengers overpowered security and occupied the runway.
- An American woman was arrested August 1, 2013, at Shannon after the Delta flight from New York to Greece she was on diverted there when she became verbally and physically abusive after crew attempted to take a glass of wine away from her due to her state of intoxication. Marianne Thatcher, 30, of New York, pleaded guilty to three charges of being drunk, abusive and threatening to crew and passengers and was fined €500.
- Barely 45 minutes into an August 9, 2013, Thomas Cook flight from Turkey to Belfast, an intoxicated Michael Paul McGrath, 20, of Lurgan, refused to return to his seat and became verbally abusive, eventually assaulting several crew members. Passengers were able to restrain him, and he eventually lost consciousness for the remainder of the flight. After being treated on arrival, he was arrested on 11 separate charges related to the event including six counts of common assault. McGrath pleaded guilty, explaining that he had combined copious alcohol consumed before the flight with some of his father's prescription pain medicine and could remember very little of the flight. He was nevertheless sentenced to five months in jail.
- Delta Air Lines Flight 181: In the first hour and a half of a flight from Detroit to Shanghai on August 18, 2013, Stephanie Heizmann Auerbach, 47, drank five glasses of white wine. Other passengers reported that when flight attendants' attention was elsewhere, she went to the cart and poured additional drinks for herself. She soon grew agitated, walking around the aisles, crawling across the tops of seats and yelling profanities at crew when they asked her to return to her seat. After being given a written warning, Auerbach hit the flight attendant in the face with it. The flight diverted to Anchorage, where Auerbach was taken off and arrested on charges of disrupting a flight. Her two children continued on to Shanghai where they were met by their father. She pleaded guilty and was sentenced to five years' probation, fined $5,000 and ordered to pay Delta the $53,026 it incurred diverting to Anchorage.
- EasyJet Flight 1328: After the September 26, 2013, flight from Malta had landed at Manchester Airport, police responded to the jet at Terminal 1, to apprehend a 52-year-old male passenger who had become verbally abusive to his fellow passengers. After deplaning, he urinated on the terminal wall and then removed all his clothing, challenging the flight's captain to a fight afterwards. A slap by a woman traveling with him failed to calm him, after which police attempted to restrain him, ultimately resorting to a Taser to subdue him. He was later arrested on a charge of being drunk and disorderly in a public place. Video of the incident went viral.
- EasyJet Flight 1872: The flight from Moscow's Domodedovo Airport to Manchester had to divert to Copenhagen on November 4, 2013, in order to put off one of the PFC CSKA Moscow fans traveling to support their team in its Champions League contest with Manchester City. Once the flight landed, the captain decided an additional six friends of the first ejectee, who had protested his removal, would have to leave as well. The flight continued to Manchester with a slight delay. The ejected passengers were able to book other flights for themselves.
- A November 11, 2013, LOT Polish Airlines flight from Warsaw to Toronto avoided having to divert when 17 off-duty police officers aboard, members of a hockey team returning from a tournament in Europe, were able to restrain an unruly passenger. Henryk Glowala, of St. Catharines, Ontario, had become disruptive after being refused alcohol, attempting to enter the cockpit and assaulting two flight attendants, trying to choke one with his belt. Crew only learned the officers were aboard when they asked the largest of the men to help them out; he and his teammates were able to keep Glowala under control for the rest of the flight. He was charged with assault, two counts of assault with a deadly weapon and endangering the safety of an aircraft.
- On December 23, 2013, Marianus Sae, head of the Ngada Regency in Indonesia's East Nusa Tenggara province, was informed that no seats remained on a Merpati Nusantara Airlines flight from Kupang, the provincial capital, to Turelelo Soa Airport in Ngada, where he had a meeting to attend. Angered, he called ahead to the island of Flores and had public order officers under his authority there park their vehicles on the runway in order to prevent the plane from landing; the intervention forced the plane to return to Kupang and resulted in several other flights diverting as well. "The airline has hampered my state duty as the government official," he explained to the media. "[I]t should be a lesson for its management." Sae's actions led to wide public outrage, but the only consequence was a letter of warning to him from Gamawan Fauzi, the country's Minister of Home Affairs.

=== 2014 ===
- Matthias Jorg, 55, of Germany, was arrested on January 1 when his Emirates flight from Singapore landed in Brisbane. An admittedly anxious flyer visiting his children on Australia's Sunshine Coast, he had long had problems sleeping before flights and consumed several small bottles of wine on the plane. It had not sufficiently relieved his issues, so he attempted to smoke a cigarette in the lavatory but was caught doing so by crew. The confrontation turned violent, with Jorg assaulting a crew member and attempting to open the cabin door, leading several passengers to stop him and injure him slightly in the process; upon his arrest after landing he headbutted one of the police constables taking him into custody. He was charged with smoking in an aircraft toilet, assaulting a cabin crew member, interfering with a cabin crew member and obstructing a Commonwealth public official. He pleaded guilty and received a one-year sentence, suspended for three years pending the execution of an AU$1,000 bond. The rest of his punishment was financial: Jorg was fined $200, ordered to pay the airline $1,449 for costs it incurred due to his behaviour and $1,115.22 in compensation to the injured crew member.
- Jennifer Lauren, 41, niece of fashion designer Ralph Lauren, was arrested on January 6 after her Delta flight from Barcelona to New York diverted to Shannon. Upon landing, Lauren was arrested by Gardaí and charged with making threats and abusive comments, exhibiting drunkenness severe enough to pose a danger to herself and others, and behaving in an obnoxious and offensive fashion. She pleaded guilty to all three charges and was fined €2,000.
- Zhengzhou Airport riot: Heavy snowstorms in China's Henan province caused flights out of Zhengzhou Xinzheng International Airport to be canceled on the evening of February 5 during the country's New Year public holiday period, the time of peak travel in the country. Stranded travelers who had been camped out in the terminal, sleeping on their bags and eating noodles, rioted that night, destroying airline computers and chairs at luggage and check-in counters and attacking airline and airport staff until police were able to get the situation under control a day later.
- A China Eastern Airlines flight to Wuhan delayed its February 16 departure from Phuket International Airport in Thailand for an hour so that a group of 27 passengers, all Chinese, could be taken off. A fight had started during boarding over a possible seating swap; eventually 15 passengers, all part of a large tour group, were involved, and the other 12 left with them. Some of those who deplaned at that time were reported as visibly injured.
- Philippine Airlines Flight 112: On a February 23 flight from Manila to Los Angeles, Edgar Nonga, a Filipino-American, became unruly when the cabin crew refused to let him drink any more from a whiskey bottle on the plane's galley. He began cursing in Tagalog, harassing a stewardess, and punching a male flight attendant before he was restrained by the crew and other passengers. He was arrested upon landing and later accepted a plea deal charging him with one count of simple assault within a maritime and territorial jurisdiction.
- Lufthansa Flight 410: Timothy Fasano, 49, of Queens, New York, was arrested at Dublin Airport on April 23 when his flight to New York from Munich diverted there following his unruliness. While on bail awaiting trial, he was arrested again for drunk and disorderly conduct in the streets of Dublin; he eventually served a three-month jail sentence, after which he was again arrested for drunk and disorderly conduct outside the U.S. embassy due to his frustrations in attempting to get his passport back so he could leave Ireland.
- Condor Airlines Flight 3196: While flying from Frankfurt to Holguín, Cuba, on April 30, Ronar Caballero-Gomez, 37, of Paris, became disruptive. After crew noticed him opening a bottle of rum he had brought along, it was confiscated and he was given a written warning. He tore it up and began opening another bottle. Caballero-Gomez then became verbally and physically abusive with crew, who soon realized he had been intoxicated before boarding; he also damaged his seat while kicking it. The pilot diverted to Shannon, where Caballero-Gomez was arrested on four separate charges. He initially pleaded not guilty and explained his intoxication, resulting from trips to the duty-free shop before departure, by stating that not only was he very anxious about flying, he had been expecting that the trip to his native country would be the last time he saw his terminally ill father alive, a trip he would now have to forego. The court fined him €1,000.
- On a July 17 Korean Air flight from Atlanta to Incheon, a drunken man surnamed Kim repeatedly hit a stewardess who tried to stop him from making unwanted advances toward a female passenger next to him. The injured attendant needed to stay 20 days in a hospital for treatment and it was reported she later filed a criminal battery complaint against him to the prosecutors' office.

External videos
- "Settle down, Captain Happy" exchange between ATL ATC and DAL 2422 on July 27, 2014

- Delta Air Lines Flight 2422: While the pilot of this flight to Charlotte was taxiing out to the runway at Atlanta's Hartsfield International Airport on the morning of July 27, the air traffic controller informed him that he would not be allowed to take off for almost a half hour. When the controller later advised the pilot that he was apparently joining the wrong taxiway, the pilot accused him of having an "attitude problem" and continued to berate the controller despite his protestations that he was just doing his job until another pilot advised the first one to "settle down, Captain Happy!" Audio of the incident was archived on LiveATC; the incident received national media attention and went viral online. Delta said the incident was not in accord with the professionalism it expects from its employees and it would be investigating internally.
- Shortly after a British Airways flight to Los Angeles took off from London on July 31, Conrad Hilton III, 20, of Los Angeles, son of hotel magnate Richard Hilton and brother of celebrity Paris Hilton, left his seat. During the flight, he regularly berated flight attendants and threatened them, as well as every other passenger on board, whom he referred to as "peasants". He repeatedly asked if he could smoke cannabis on board, was caught attempting to disable the smoke detector in the lavatory, and said any problems he caused would be dealt with by his father paying off the airline, which he claimed had happened before, although he admitted to having been banned by other airlines. Shortly before landing the pilot had crew restrain him while he was sleeping. Hilton was arrested by the FBI in February 2015 and charged with interfering with a flight crew. He had explained to agents who interviewed him that he was angry because he had just broken up with a girlfriend, had been on two flights from Greece beforehand that day, and took a sleeping pill before boarding the flight to Los Angeles. After pleading to assault he was sentenced to three years' probation and fined $5,000.
- On August 21 in a United Airlines flight from Narita to Houston, an unnamed Japanese female passenger reported to an attendant instances of abusive sexual contact from a 36-year-old man, who was seated next to her. She was quickly moved to a different seat. The day after, he was taken to U.S. federal custody where he admitted to groping her private areas beneath her underwear. He was sentenced to 180 days in prison, a $5,000 fine and five years of probation.
- United Airlines Flight 1462: Early in the August 26 flight from Newark to Denver, a male passenger affixed a Knee Defender, a device banned by most American airlines which prevents the seats from being reclined, to the seat in front of him so he would be able to work on his laptop. The woman sitting in it was angered, and eventually the confrontation escalated to the point where she threw water at him, and the flight diverted to Chicago so they could be taken off; however, neither was arrested.
- Two incidents off the U.S. East Coast resulted in diversions on August 27, 2014:
  - Sunwing Flight 656: On their flight from Toronto to Cuba, Lilia Ratmanski, 25, of Whitby, Ontario, and Milana Muzikante, 26, of Vaughan, Ontario, consumed a large quantity of duty-free alcohol in their possession and then went to the lavatory to smoke. When the smoke detector went off, the two began fighting with each other and crew members, and during the brawl, they claimed to have a bomb. Even though the plane was already over international waters off the U.S. East Coast by then, the captain decided to return to Toronto. Due to the bomb threat, North American Air Defense Command assigned two Royal Canadian Air Force CF-18 fighter jets to escort the plane back to Pearson Airport once it re-entered Canadian airspace. The pair were arrested and charged with smoking on board an aircraft, endangering the safety of an aircraft, mischief, mischief endangering life and uttering threats; they later pleaded guilty and received a conditional discharge, of particular importance to Muzikante because she otherwise faced deportation to Germany and would be unable to obtain a nursing license. The judge also fined them both CAN$500 and ordered them to repay Sunwing $7,500 in costs for the incident; Sunwing banned the two from ever flying with them again.
  - An American Airlines flight from Miami to Paris diverted to Boston to put off a passenger who had become unruly following a dispute with the woman in front of him when she reclined her seat. When an attendant failed to resolve the problem to his satisfaction Edmond Alexandre, 47, of Paris, ran after her and grabbed her by the arm, whereupon he was arrested by two U.S. air marshals on the plane. He eventually pleaded guilty to interfering with a flight crew and was sentenced to time served, fined $1,000, and ordered to pay the airline $6,303 in restitution.
- After being refused further liquor on a September 6 Emirates flight from Dubai to Birmingham, England, Jasbir Singh Bharaj, 46, of Leicester, became verbally abusive, saying things to the crew such as "fucking Muslims ... send them back to where they came from" and accusing of them of being members of ISIS, then physically threatened them and caused £2,500 in damage to the in-flight entertainment system. At one point, in full view of a female flight attendant, he dipped his fingers in wine and rubbed them on his genitals, while upon landing, he assaulted and verbally abused police officers before being taken into custody. Bharaj, who had a prior criminal record, was involved in another incident of drunk and disorderly behaviour in a Birmingham hotel while on bail, which ended with him directing racial slurs at and attempting to assault the arresting officers. He was eventually convicted of drunkenness on an aircraft, criminal damage, racially aggravated words and behaviour, common assault and other offences, and was sentenced to 21 months in prison.
- A Virgin Australia flight from Brisbane to Darwin diverted to Townsville on September 9 to put off Stephen Boyd Jones, 45, of Brisbane. After a cart being pushed through the aisle bumped his knee, he became verbally abusive and assaulted a fellow passenger. After being arrested in Townsville, it was discovered he had carried a knife on board; he was charged with assaulting crew, offensive and disorderly behaviour, possession of prohibited items on board an aircraft and carrying prohibited items through a screening point.
- Etihad Airways Flight 470: A 30-year-old Australian male passenger who others noticed had been acting strangely at Singapore Changi Airport even before boarding the flight to Brisbane on October 3 became physically and verbally abusive during the flight. He had been calmed down and remained so for the flight's first 40 minutes, then suddenly tore the video monitor out of the seat in front of him, claiming there was a bomb behind it. He then began attacking passengers and crew, throwing a male flight attendant to the deck at one point and biting a passenger who tried to restrain him, ranting incoherently about religion as he did. The plane then returned to Singapore, where he was taken off.
- On October 23, McCleish Christmas Benham, 27, of Shelbyville, Tennessee, was arrested at Dallas/Fort Worth International Airport after he was caught on camera kicking an elderly gay man in the groin and hitting his head after saying homophobic insults against the gay man for wearing a pink shirt. Benham was then restrained to the ground by several male passengers until police officers came to arrest him. Benham was then taken out of the airport in handcuffs by police officers and was charged with assault and public intoxication. The victim declined medical attention.
- Shane Mathew Diedrichs, 38, of New Zealand, was fined AU$600 after striking the seat of a passenger in front of him when the passenger reclined it during a November flight from Wellington to Brisbane. He had hit it hard enough to cause whiplash.
- Aer Lingus Flight 110: During the November 10 flight from New York to Shannon, Cranberries lead singer Dolores O'Riordan, 44, was verbally and physically abusive with crew. When police were arresting her after landing, she resisted, reminding them her taxes paid their wages and shouting "I'm the Queen of Limerick! I'm an icon!", headbutted one garda and spat at another. Later, she told the media that she had been stressed from living in New York hotels following the end of her 20-year marriage; her family also saw the signs of the bipolar disorder she later disclosed she had been diagnosed with. The judge hearing her case agreed to dismiss all charges if she apologized in writing to those she injured and contributed €6,000 to the court poor box.
- Shortly after leaving Manchester on a November 25, 2014 on a Thomas Cook flight for a honeymoon in Cuba, a 22-year-old man of Blackburn drank a bottle of duty-free vodka he had purchased. His wife decided to move away from him as a result; when he asked an attendant if he could move next to her and was refused, Khelya loudly threatened to kill everyone on the plane. He was later handcuffed and the plane diverted to Bermuda to put him off. His wife continued to Cuba without him; after his arrest he pleaded guilty to drunkenness on an aircraft and abusive behavior to flight staff and was fined BD$3,000.
- Malaysian Airlines Flight 2: Early in the December 3 flight from Kuala Lumpur to Heathrow, David Morris, 43, of Ash Vale, England, had five double shots of whisky. When crew refused him further service, he became verbally abusive: London Mayor Boris Johnson, who was also on the flight, sat next to him briefly and was able to calm him, but only temporarily. After another outburst, in which he assaulted crew, he was restrained for the balance of the flight. Upon landing, he was arrested and charged with assault and drunkenness on a flight. He later pleaded guilty despite claiming to have no memory of the incident, and was sentenced to six months in prison.
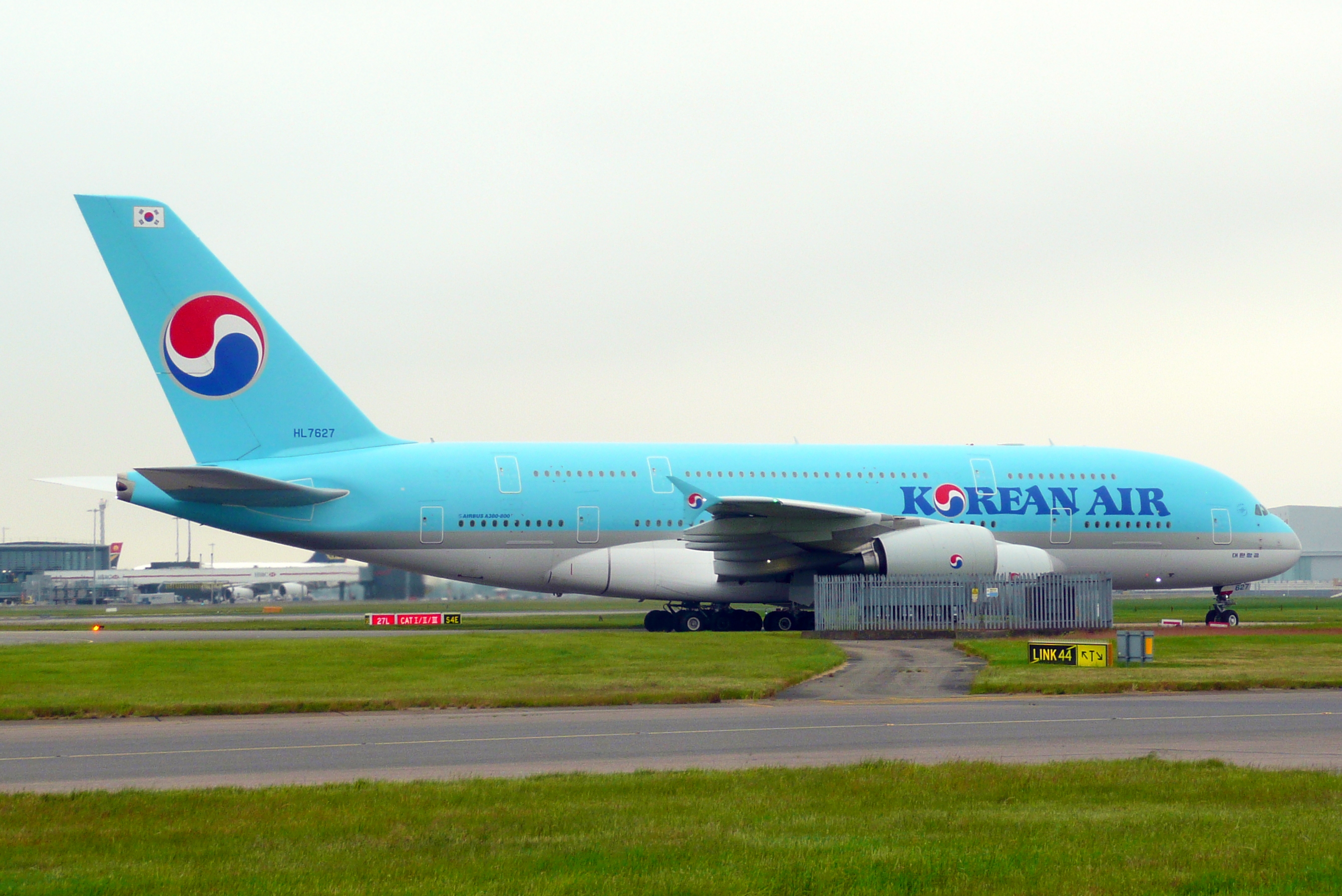
- Korean Air Flight 86
  Korean Air Flight 86: As the December 5 flight from New York to Seoul's Incheon International Airport was being pushed back from its gate at Kennedy, flight attendants served first-class passengers macadamia nuts in the bags they had been packed in. One passenger, Heather Cho, known in her native country as Cho Hyun-ah, 40, the airline's vice president in charge of cabin service, and daughter of its chairman Cho Yang-ho, was angered, as she believed that airline policy dictated that first-class passengers be served their nuts in small bowls, and only if they had asked for them (which she had not). She asked to talk to Park Chang-jin, the flight's chief flight attendant, and by some accounts made him get on his knees and beg for forgiveness before she reportedly hit him with her tablet. In any case, she was insufficiently satisfied with his apologies, and fired him on the spot, ordering the pilot to turn around and have the dismissed employee escorted off the aircraft before it resumed course for Korea, delaying departure by 20 minutes. When international news media reported on the incident, South Korean authorities began investigating. Park, who was soon reinstated, claimed the airline had pressured him to say he had voluntarily resigned in response to those inquiries, and had also tried to get other employees who had witnessed the incident to relate more sanitized versions to investigators. After it emerged that the airline had covered up a similar incident the year before in which Cho had assaulted an attendant over her disappointment with a bowl of ramen served to her, she resigned all her posts with the airline. She was later convicted in South Korea of obstructing aviation safety and sentenced to a year in jail. The episode, which became known as the "nut rage incident", opened up a national debate about the governance of the chaebols, the large family-owned multi-industrial conglomerates that dominate the country's economy.
- Thai AirAsia Flight 9101: A group of four Chinese passengers had an altercation with crew on the December 11 flight to Nanjing. Traveling as part of a group tour, they first became upset when they could not sit together, even after a flight attendant tried to make that possible. One of the men in the group then later became angry at another attendant when she told him that change for a drink he had bought could only be given in Thai baht, not renminbi as he had requested, and could not give him a receipt. A woman accompanying him then threw hot water and noodles at the attendant, scalding her. As the conflict escalated, one claimed to be carrying a bomb and the woman ran to the door, threatening to jump off the plane. The plane then returned to Bangkok, where the gang of four were taken off by police. They were ordered to pay the attendant ฿50,000 and fined ฿500, then put on another plane for Nanjing. When they arrived, they refused to leave the airplane until the airline issued a statement calling early media reports of the episode untrue (they claimed the scalding was accidental). China's National Tourism Administration suspended the tour operator's license for a year, placed the four on a blacklist, and issued a statement saying that they had "badly damaged the overall image of the Chinese people."
- Air China Flight 433: Shortly after departing Chongqing on December 18, two women told another one traveling behind them that the child with her was too loud. After the child did not quiet down, they reclined their seats into her and the child, which led immediately to a fight between the three women plus one traveling with the mother. The pilot had to warn them to stop or he would return the plane to Chongqing; when the plane reached Hong Kong police took the three into custody for questioning. Photos taken by a passenger during the altercation, one showing one of the women's head being slammed into the overhead compartment, went viral on the Internet after being republished in media accounts.

=== 2015 ===
- South Korean singer Bobby Kim, 41, was arrested when his Korean Air flight from Seoul landed at San Francisco International Airport on January 7. He had been upset on boarding when he was given an economy-class seat instead of the business-class seat he had reserved. Kim dealt with it initially by drinking six glasses of wine and then falling asleep. When he awoke, however, he began screaming and continued doing so for an hour; at one point he grabbed a flight attendant around the waist. He later claimed to have no memory of the incident. A South Korean court convicted him of causing a disturbance while intoxicated, fined him ₩4 million and ordered him to attend a 40-day sexual harassment seminar.
- China Eastern Airlines Flight 2036: Two hours after passengers at Kunming Changshui boarded the flight to Beijing at 3:45 a.m. on January 10, delayed seven hours after its scheduled departure due to weather that had already canceled many other flights, the pilot announced that due to the weather, de-icing fluid would be applied to the plane, a process that would delay departure another half-hour. In order to facilitate the process, the plane's air conditioning was turned off for the duration. Shortly afterwards, an elderly passenger complained that he was feeling uncomfortable and stifled and as the plane pushed back from the gate, some members of a tour group began arguing with the crew on the issue. Later, three of the emergency exits opened just as the plane began moving. The flight was further delayed as police, after boarding the plane and investigating, charged two members of a tour group, including the guide, with violating safety regulations and sent them to jail for 15 days.
- A Ryanair flight from Latvia to Dublin diverted to Copenhagen on February 10, to put off a passenger who, after drinking to the point of intoxication, stood in the aisles with his shirt off, posing in a manner one witness likened to the Incredible Hulk, and repeatedly punching the walls of the plane. While he did not engage in any violence toward crew or passengers, he was taken into custody by Danish police and banned from flying the airline again.
- On March 30, a Qatar Airways flight from Doha to Manchester diverted to Birmingham when strong winds made landing at the former airport impossible. The plane remained on the tarmac for five hours while the weather persisted, it was refueled and a new crew took over. Passengers grew sufficiently angry at this delay that West Midlands Police were called into the plane to restore order, after which the airline canceled the flight and arranged the passengers' bus transfers to Manchester.
- Air India Flight 611: Before takeoff from Jaipur International Airport on April 5, the pilot and co-pilot reportedly came to blows during routine preflight checks, an account the airline later denied. According to later accounts, however, the co-pilot took offence when the younger pilot called him "Uncle", normally a term of respect addressed to any older man in India and beat his commander at length as a result. The pilot decided to continue with the flight to Delhi and reported the incident afterwards; both men were suspended pending further investigation.
- Air India Flight 194: On the April 26 flight from Riyadh to Calicut, a male passenger became violent after crew refused him further alcohol due to his apparent intoxication. He threatened crew, other passengers and destroyed two armrests. On landing he was taken into police custody.
- An April 29 Norwegian Air flight from Gatwick to Fort Lauderdale, Florida, diverted to Shannon to put off a 26-year-old man from Miami. After drinking a liter of gin he had concealed in a Coke bottle, he went into the lavatory, where his attempt to vape set off a smoke detector. Upon being confronted by flight attendants, he grew angry and abusive, shouting obscenities at crew and attempting to assault them; eventually he was restrained so the flight could divert. He pleaded guilty to engaging in threatening and insulting behaviour aboard an aircraft, and was fined €1,000.
- United Airlines Flight 971: Shortly after the flight to Chicago took off from Rome on June 20, a 42-year-old passenger from Berkeley, California, stood up and demanded crackers. After the crew managed to oblige him, he asked for more. When they refused to do so until others had been similarly served, he grew angry and, although neither making threats nor assaulting anyone, made the pilot concerned enough that he first asked other sufficiently large male passengers to sit around him, then finally decided to dump fuel and divert to Belfast. The man was arrested and charged with endangering the safety of an aircraft. Since the crew would have exceeded their maximum flying hours for the day if the flight continued, it was necessary to wait 24 hours before resuming; the 264 passengers had to sleep on the floor at Belfast International Airport. He was eventually acquitted of the charges; he argued that the cabin crew had grossly overstated his actions, that he was hungry and had on many other United flights never been denied crackers and had a right to complain.
- A 48-year-old man from Aspull, England, was arrested after his July 9 British Airways flight from London to Houston, Texas, diverted to Boston to have him taken off. After becoming intoxicated on the plane, he had become verbally abusive to his wife, crew and other passengers. He assaulted his wife and crew, and urinated in the corridors several times. He was deported to the UK after several days in jail.
- US Airways Flight 732: The July 22 flight from Charlotte to London turned around over Nova Scotia to divert to Philadelphia, where it was canceled and passengers put on other flights, so a 41-year-old woman from Charlotte, could be arrested on charges of interfering with a flight crew. After taking a prescription Zaleplon to help her sleep and drinking three glasses of wine, she told the FBI agent who interviewed her later, she remembered nothing until she woke up in custody. In the interim she had become verbally abusive, breaking an interior window with a thrown remote control, acting menacingly outside the cockpit door and twice breaking free of plastic handcuffs; when she was cuffed the third time passengers and crew taped her legs together. She later pleaded guilty and received five years' probation, during which she was banned from flying and required to submit to substance-abuse testing.
- Singapore Airlines drew criticism for its handling of a mentally unstable passenger on a July 23 flight from San Francisco to Incheon International. According to multiple sources, a drunken Singaporean assailant, 20, stood up and slapped a flight attendant. He then barged into the flight galley, grabbed a bottle of champagne, and poured it on a Korean female passenger in front of him. He then allegedly threatened and kicked her several times. Flight attendants subdued him and the airline official called the Incheon Airport Police, but failed to request an investigation. Police questioned him briefly but found his behavior not serious enough to issue an arrest warrant for. He flew back to Singapore two days later.
- When a man from Colorado Springs, Colorado, missed a connecting flight to Denver at Philadelphia on August 4, US Airways upgraded him to first class on its next flight there as compensation. However, he consumed enough alcohol for flight attendants to refuse him further service; he responded by sexually harassing them and becoming verbally abusive, at one point threatening to take the plane down. The pilot, who could hear the man from the cockpit even with his headphones on and the door closed, locked it down in response. The man was arrested and charged with interfering with a flight crew; after a three-day trial he was convicted and sentenced to four months in prison.
- A 29-year-old man flying from Barcelona on EasyJet was arrested upon landing at Gatwick on August 22. After being refused further alcohol on board due to his intoxication, he threatened flight attendants, addressing one of them with a homophobic slur, and refused to stay in his seat when required. He later pleaded guilty to being drunk in an aircraft, using threatening/abusive or insulting words to cause fear of unlawful violence and causing racially aggravated harassment/alarm or distress.
- Qantas Flight 163: In mid-flight between Sydney and Wellington, New Zealand, on September 24 a 44-year-old man from Wellington, became verbally abusive as a consequence of his intoxication. He refused to return to his seat when asked; eventually passengers and crew had to restrain him and he was arrested and charged with offensive behavior on landing. New Zealand's Civil Aviation Authority fined him NZ$1,100, Qantas banned him their flights and Jetstar's for five years and the court placed him under supervision for nine months.
- Southwest Airlines Flight 2010: A half-hour after this flight to San Francisco left the gate at Los Angeles International Airport on October 18 it turned around and taxied back after two passengers began fighting over a reclined seat. They were questioned by the FBI; the other passengers boarded another plane to complete their journey.
- British Airways Flight 213: After the flight from London landed at Boston's Logan International Airport on November 17, police arrested a 32-year-old female Polish citizen living in Austria, and charged her with interfering with a flight crew. During the flight, apparently intoxicated from a combination of alcohol and sleeping pills, she had attempted to open the cabin door.
- American Airlines Flights 704 and 705: Before Flight 704, bound for Frankfurt, had even left Charlotte on November 23, several flight attendants told one of the federal air marshals aboard the plane that one of their coworkers, a 67-year-old woman, was acting erratically enough to be considered a possible threat to flight security. The airline, however, declined to remove her from duty. She herself told an air marshal interviewing her that she was "crazy" and "a train wreck". One of the marshals had to prevent her from opening the cabin door while the plane was taxiing; during the actual flight she assaulted some of them, as well as her supervisor. While on the return leg, Flight 705, the next day, she did not assault anyone, she was observed to be "mentally unstable" the entire time; after arrival in Charlotte she attempted to run past passport control, claiming the air marshals were after her and resisting arrest when taken into custody. She had reportedly had a bad reaction to a prescription medication and was found not guilty by reason of insanity.

=== 2016 ===
- Delta Air Lines Flight 2598: An hour after leaving Los Angeles on January 22, the captain diverted to Salt Lake City after a flight attendant attempting to break up a fistfight between two of her coworkers was injured doing so, to the point that she could no longer continue performing her duties. After taking on replacements, the flight continued to Minneapolis, its original destination. Delta wrote a letter to apologizing to passengers for the incident, but any other action it took remained internal.
- June 23, 2016 Perth - Bali incident: An Australian man claimed mistreatment at Denpasar Airport, alleging violent detention for over 10 hours. He asserted being assaulted by airport staff, who reportedly taped his hands and legs while continuing the assault. The incident gained attention after a Snapchat post circulated where the man boasted about passing acid through Bali Customs. Despite his claims, Balinese Police and Australian authorities contradicted his account, stating he was intoxicated, disorderly and belligerent to airline and airport staff during the flight from Perth. The Australian Department of Foreign Affairs and Trade mentioned his continued intoxication, preventing his immediate return. The man was subsequently returned to Perth.
- A Tigerair flight attendant placed a pair of crutches in an overhead compartment on a February 23, flight from Kuala Lumpur to Singapore, warning the passengers underneath to be careful when opening it. As passengers were retrieving their belongings from those compartments upon landing, one of the crutches fell on Chong Nyok Keiw, 57, of Malaysia. The flight attendant who had packed them apologized to Chong when she retrieved them for their owner, but Chong insisted on compensation for her perceived injury, positioning herself to block other passengers from deplaning. When the attendant insisted Chong step aside and allow others to leave the aircraft, Chong punched her twice in the face. Police arrested Chong, and she later pleaded guilty to a charge of causing hurt. She was sentenced to five days in jail.
- EasyJet Flight 1973: Before the May 11 flight to Paphos had left the gate at Manchester, a 25-year-old woman was ordered off the plane due to her disorderly behaviour. On her way out, she punched the captain in the face, delaying departure for two hours. Police arrested her on suspicion of assault.
- British Airways Flight 104: As a flight from Dubai approached Heathrow shortly after Easter, passenger Joshua Strickland, 21, of Sidcup, became verbally abusive to crew and severely bit a passenger who helped restrain him. He was eventually convicted and sentenced to nine months, suspended for 18, assessed a total of £1,040 in costs and compensation and ordered to complete 220 hours of community service.
- On May 28, police arrested Thomas Beard, 54, of Clayton-le-Dale, when his Emirates flight from Dubai arrived in Manchester. He had grown verbally abusive with other passengers and then with crew; just before landing he warned an attendant not to take his wine, before drinking an entire half-bottle. Eventually 15 empty liquor bottles were discovered around his seat. Beard pleaded guilty to drunkenness aboard an aircraft and was fined £900, as well as an additional £90 in victim surcharges and £85 in court costs.
- Korean Airlines Flight 2115: On an April 17 flight from Seoul to Guam, passenger Kwon Woo Sung became unruly after reportedly consuming five beers. He began scuffling with the supervising flight attendant after he was told he wouldn't be served more beers. After the attendant asked passengers for help, four or five others managed to restrain Sung and hold him down for the remainder of the flight. The attendant sustained bruising on his back and chest, a cut on his hand, and a puncture wound on his upperbody. Sung was originally sentenced for 28 months and 9 days in a U.S. federal prison but after numerous appeals and letters of remorse from him as well as a mistake from the judge, along with pleas for leniency from his loved ones and the Korean community, he was resentenced to 18 months in prison in October 2017.
- A June Jet2 flight from Barcelona to Glasgow was diverted to Nantes Atlantique Airport in France after Kyle Falconer, 30, lead singer of Scottish band The View, became unruly. After being unable to sit with his fiancée, he became verbally abusive to the man seated next to her, then with crew who asked him to quiet down.
- Las Vegas police met a Thomas Cook flight from Manchester when it arrived at McCarran International Airport on June 15. A group of 20 men on a bachelor party had severely disrupted the flight, becoming severely intoxicated and abusive to crew. One was banned from his return flight; others were informed that they would be allowed to return only if they signed good-behaviour contracts allowing the airline to refuse to board them if they were drunk.
- A July 7 Jet2 flight from Glasgow to Ibiza diverted to Toulouse, where French police arrested Liam McKeown, 25, of Cumbernauld, after he had drunkenly asked a flight attendant to expose various parts of her body to him and threatened her physically if she did not. In February 2017 he pleaded guilty in Paisley Sheriff Court to being drunk on board an aircraft and behaving in a threatening or abusive manner on a flight. Since the law did not provide for a custodial sentence for those offences, he was fined £3,200, payable in installments of £50 a month, and ordered to pay £5,200 in restitution to the airline, which made him its 75th passenger to be banned for life.
- A July 13 Jet2 flight from Leeds Bradford to Larnaca returned towards England while over the North Sea so Joshua Strickland, 21, of York, could be arrested by police in Manchester. He had been abusive and disruptive from takeoff, in particular growing upset with a Cypriot family he had been seated next to initially. Even as the plane began descending to Manchester, he said he "might as well knock someone out". Strickland, who already had an extensive prior record, pleaded guilty to drunkenness on an aircraft and was sentenced to six months in prison; Jet2 banned him for life as well.
- Jetstar Flight 27: After six Australian male passengers got into a drunken brawl on board, the July 20 flight from Sydney to Phuket diverted to Bali to have them taken off. Indonesian authorities declined to arrest them and turned the case over to their Australian counterparts; in the meantime both Jetstar and its parent airline, Qantas, banned them from ever flying either airline again after they returned home.
- Cathay Pacific Flight 746: A dispute occurred between the cabin crew and 36-year-old Chinese woman after she learned that her children's meals had not been prepared in advance of the July 30 flight from Dubai to Hong Kong. It culminated in her hurling orange juice at a flight attendant. Upon landing she was arrested and charged with common assault.
- Cebu Pacific Flight 5J955: A female passenger became irate on a July 30 flight from Manila to Davao in the Philippines. Maria Vicenta Tello reportedly began berating a flight attendant, Grace Fatima, for telling her to stow the bag she had at her seat to the overhead bin. When the stewardess told another attendant, Madel Ty, the latter went over, saw that it remained unstowed, and put it in the bin herself. Tello then asked for her name and complained of a lack of respect. When the plane reached its destination, she opted to deplane last and was reportedly muttering that she wanted to slap the initial attendant, Grace. She then confronted Ty and slapped her on the face. The crew then attempted to hold Tello for the airport police, but she claimed to be the wife of a colonel in the Armed Forces of the Philippines. Ty later filed a lawsuit against her for slander by deed and slight physical injury while the airline put her on an indefinite blacklist.
- Japan Airlines Flight 150: Yoshitoshi Aida, 70, was reportedly drunk when he was told to buckle his seatbelt by a 31-year-old stewardess in a flight departing from Aomori to Haneda Airport on August 2. According to police, he started screaming and kicked her in the leg. After another stewardess came to tie down his arms and legs, he kicked her in the back. Both attendants sustained injuries that required two to three weeks to heal. He later refused to divulged any details during his arrest without a lawyer.
- EasyJet Flight 835: As the flight to Belfast taxied out to the runway at Gatwick on August 24, 2016, two flight attendants began arguing over how the water bottles were to be packed. The dispute grew severe enough that the captain decided to return to the gate and have them both taken off and replaced, which delayed the flight for an hour. Television presenter Dan Lobb, a passenger on the flight, provided regular updates on his Twitter feed.
- EasyJet Flight 134: On September 9, the flight to Manchester turned around while waiting to take off from Belfast after a passenger, apparently intoxicated, attacked a flight attendant. Departure was delayed an hour while police took the passenger into custody and replacement crew arrived. As with the EasyJet incident two weeks before, a television journalist, UTV's Sharon O'Neill, provided live Twitter updates.
- An Aeroflot flight from Beijing to Moscow diverted to Yemelyanovo International Airport at Krasnoyarsk on September 30, in order to put off Andrey K., a 37-year-old Russian living in Beijing. He had gotten intoxicated on the flight and became verbally abusive to crew, sexually harassing female flight attendants.
- On October 31 at Narita International Airport, Mariko Murakami, 35, became enraged when a ticket machine didn't accept her credit card or cash payment for a trip to Honolulu. She cracked a panel of the machine with her hand and kicked a female airline employee in the crotch when she tried to calm her down. She later admitted to the charges filed against her of assault and destruction of property.
- Shortly after an Emirates flight to Birmingham took off from Dubai on November 17, Khaled Mir, 39, of Saltley, Birmingham, became disruptive. After consuming duty-free vodka, he became involved in a dispute with the woman sitting in front of him. This escalated to verbal abuse of the crew, including calling a flight attendant a "dirty white" and spitting at her when she tried to persuade him to drink his liquor through a straw; passengers and crew worked together to restrain him in his seat and cover his mouth with a mask, which they later observed Mir trying to remove with his tongue. Several months later he pleaded guilty to being drunk on an aircraft and failing to obey the lawful command of the pilot. He was sentenced to seven months in prison; the court took note of 50 previous convictions on his record. In 2019 he was jailed for drunk driving, reckless driving, and driving while disqualified. He attributed this and his previous offenses to drinking as a result of the death of his parents.
- Aeroflot Flight 107: Early on the morning of November 25, the flight from Los Angeles to Moscow diverted to Iqaluit in the Canadian Arctic to put off Sisak Khudaverdyan, 36, an Armenian national living in Los Angeles. He had grown disruptive on the plane, walking around the aisles and telling passengers he was a terrorist. Russian boxer Denis Lebedev, one of the passengers, said later that despite being afraid for his life with Khudaverdyan on the plane he did not feel the need to assist the flight crew since they had gotten things under control well before the emergency landing. Khudaverdyan was arrested and charged with endangering the safety of an aircraft, mischief, causing a disturbance and endangering passengers; however, court action was deferred as he was placed under psychiatric observation for 60 days.
- After James August, of New Jersey, slapped a flight attendant and grew disorderly when she asked him to move to another seat on a November 29 Hawaiian Airlines flight from Honolulu to New York, the pilot decided to return and have August arrested. He claimed to have no memory of the incident, but later pleaded guilty to interfering with a flight crew and was fined $98,000, including some of the airline's costs, and given three years' probation.
- Asiana Airlines Flight 222: A December 2 flight from Seoul to New York was delayed for about an hour due to a bloody fight between two co-pilots. One of them was taken off the flight for medical treatment while the other pilot was injured but allowed to fly after the company's safety director checked his condition and determined that he would not compromise safety. A substitute pilot was brought in. The airline came under fire after the incident was brought to light and the two were questioned by the company for disciplinary action.
- Korean Air Flight 480: After having two-and-a-half glasses of whiskey with his meal, a Korean passenger on the December 20 flight from Hanoi to Seoul, began arguing loudly with his seatmate. When flight attendants tried to calm him, he became physically abusive with them. Other passengers intervened to restrain him, including singer Richard Marx, who provided rope. Crew were at one point prepared to use a Taser but did not since there were too many passengers too close to him. Upon landing at Incheon, the man was taken into police custody. Marx later posted pictures of the incident, and a narrative, to his Facebook page. He excoriated the airline for, in his opinion, having failed to properly train its flight attendants in how to deal with passengers who become violent. While the airline responded that it did in fact provide such training, one commentator on Marx's Facebook page likened its hiring procedures for flight attendants to a beauty pageant.

External videos
- Passengers being arrested on DAL 2565 after its return to MSP

- Delta Air Lines Flight 2565: Shortly after its December 29 departure for Los Angeles, the plane returned to Minneapolis–Saint Paul International Airport, making good on the captain's promise to a disorderly couple on board. Anna Koosmann, 36, of Edina, Minnesota, had apparently grown verbally abusive during takeoff when ordered back to her seat after trying to use the lavatory, and refused to return, prompting the captain's threat. Neither she nor her traveling companion, Blake Fleisig, 35, of Los Angeles, calmed down in response, and an hour after taking off the flight was back on the runway. Police came onto the plane and arrested the two on state charges of disorderly conduct; Koosmann also was charged with obstructing the legal process. Video of their arrest, in which Fleisig is handcuffed after striking a passenger who taunted him on his way out and Koosmann loudly questions why she is being arrested as passengers applaud and cheer the couple's removal, went viral online. Charges against Fleisig were later dropped; Koosmann pleaded guilty to the obstruction charge and was sentenced to 10 days of community service, a year's probation, and fined.

=== 2017 ===
- United Airlines Flight 870: On January 1, a passenger became unruly 40 minutes after the flight for San Francisco took off from Sydney. The man, described as a 42-year-old American, seemed disturbed and possibly under the influence to other passengers, especially since one of the sources of his anger was the crew's refusal to serve him any alcohol. He was, they said, primarily upset about being seated between a couple who talked constantly over him, and even more upset that they were South Asian. Even after being moved to an aisle seat he continued to complain and became verbally abusive to flight attendants, calling them "faggots" and "fatasses". After being advised that the plane would have to divert if he continued his behavior, he responded "Do you know how cool it would be to have the airplane turned around because of me? You do that." The flight was over Tonga, and after pilots were denied permission to land at Fiji or American Samoa, decided to turn south and head for Auckland, which would allow them to burn enough fuel to land safely. The man was arrested on landing, but instead of filing charges against him New Zealand authorities refused to permit him into the country and sent him back to the U.S. on another flight. Passengers spent the night in Auckland hotels paid for by the airline; videos of the incident went viral.
- United Airlines Flight 455: On February 11, the pilot of the flight from Austin, Texas, to Los Angeles arrived at the plane in street clothes and immediately began arguing with other crew members. Passengers assumed that she was another one of them until she took the microphone and told them she was the pilot of the flight. Initially she apologized for being out of uniform, saying she was going through a divorce; passengers sympathized with her at first but soon grew concerned when she began talking about politics, calling both Hillary Clinton and Donald Trump "assholes". As she called for a vote on whether she should change into her uniform, and promised she would let her copilot fly the plane, passengers began leaving out of fear she was not mentally competent to fly. Eventually the airline removed her and assigned another pilot to the plane, delaying its departure by 90 minutes. Videos of the original pilot's rant went viral on social media.
- During a March Air India flight from Delhi to Pune, Ravindra Gaikwad, 56, a member of the Lok Sabha, the lower house of India's Parliament, struck a flight attendant 25 times with his slippers after the attendant refused to give him a business class seat, since the plane was all-economy. Air India and all the member airlines of the Federation of Indian Airlines banned him from their flights as a result; despite denunciations of his behavior from other MPs and widespread dissemination of a video of the incident on social media he continued to insist in the media and on the floor of Parliament that he had done nothing wrong. Eventually Air India agreed to let him fly again; however, some of the airline's pilots refused to do so until he apologized to the attendant he had struck.
- Alison Devine, 41, of Bogside, North Lanarkshire, was arrested when her Aer Lingus flight from Glasgow landed at Donegal Airport on March 22. Before boarding the plane, which she was taking to get to an alcoholism rehabilitation facility in Termon, she had had an entire bottle of wine and several small bottles of gin. While she did not consume any more liquor on the flight, the intoxication was serious enough that she grew verbally abusive and injured a flight attendant she attacked, actions she claimed when sober after her arrest to have no memory of. She pleaded guilty to assault and being drunk on an aircraft and was required to make a €200 charitable contribution.
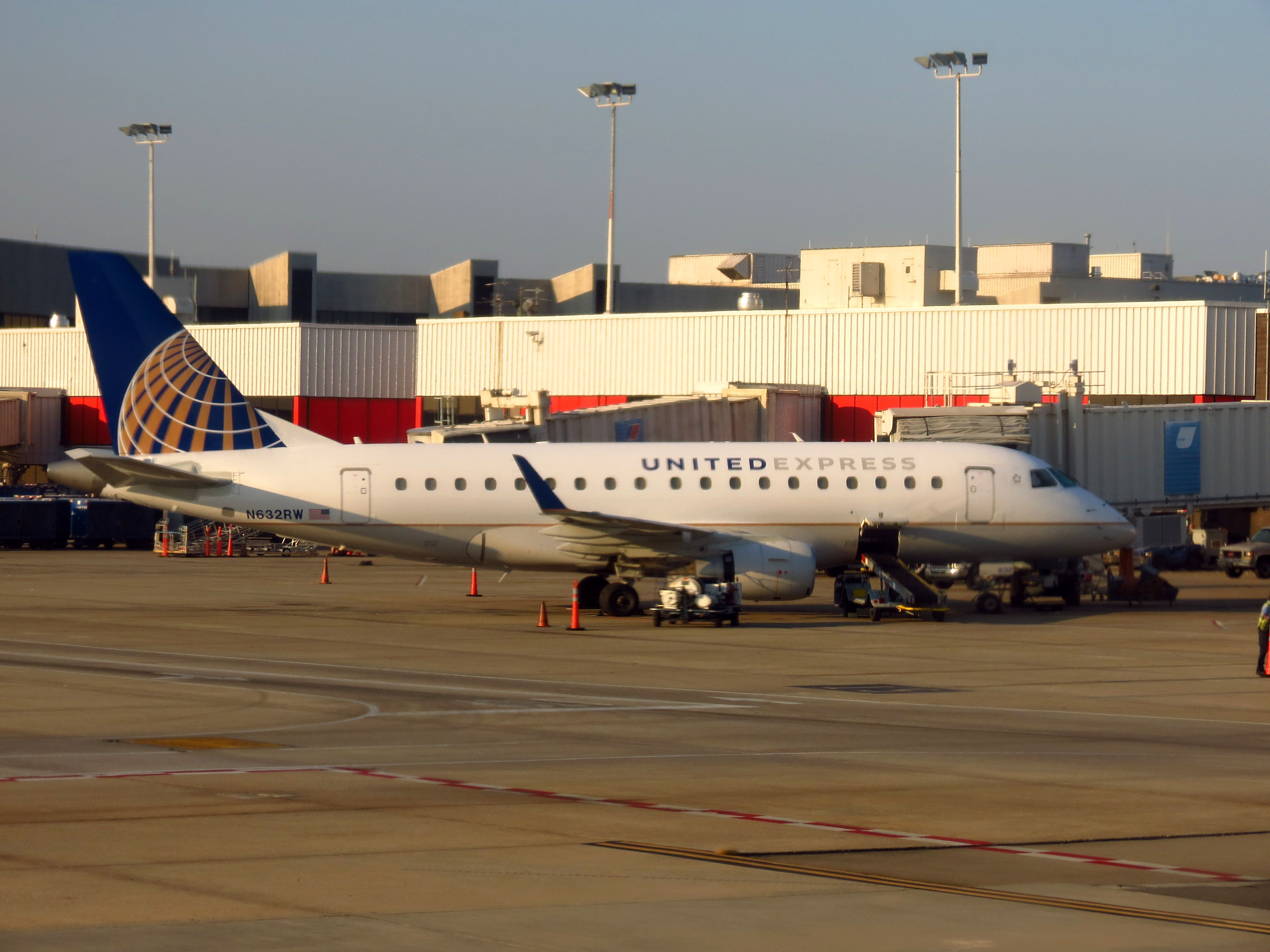
- United Express Flight 3411
  United Express Flight 3411: Passengers on the overbooked flight were told that four of them would need to give up their seats so deadheading crew could get to Louisville for their flight. When no one volunteered, four were selected; David Dao, 69, of Louisville, Kentucky, who was one of the four passengers booted off the flight, refused to give up his seat, explaining that he was a doctor and needed to see his patients the next day. Officers from the Chicago Department of Aviation boarded the plane and proceeded to physically assault Dao, inflicting injuries to his nose, mouth, and face. Video of the incident showing a bloodied Dao being dragged down the aircraft's aisle by the officers went viral on social media; President Donald Trump criticized the airline and executives who later publicly apologized for the incident and the police officers who assaulted Dao either resigned or were fired from the force.
- On April 20, a drunk Australian man named Jason Peter Darragh, age 44, was arrested at Changi Airport in Singapore by six members of the Singapore Police Force for trespassing and for assaulting one of the officers. The assault occurred after the officers caught him red-handed misusing a boarding pass to wander into the airport's transit area and questioned him about it. Darragh was charged with assaulting an officer, vulgar language, mischief, criminal force, trespassing, and public annoyance. The Government of Singapore warned that all people (including tourists) who enter the airport to purchase a ticket and boarding pass and enter Changi Airport's transit area must board a flight or otherwise they will get arrested by officials of the police force and end up in prison on trespassing charges. At least 59 people (including tourists) were already arrested at the airport for trespassing and misusing their boarding passes and tickets.
- Two incidents took place on May 1:
  - All Nippon Airways Flight 6. Before the flight for Los Angeles even left the gate at Tokyo's Narita International Airport, two male passengers, both American, got into a fistfight that was at first defused by a flight attendant but then resumed when she left. Departure was delayed for 90 minutes while both were taken off the plane and detained by police. Video of the incident went viral online.
  - On a Ryanair flight from Tenerife to Cork, Michael Murphy, 35, of Blarney, was caught stealing some paninis from the food cart. Afterwards he became disruptive and assaulted a flight attendant. He was arrested on landing and charged with those offences as well as being drunk on an aircraft.
- United Airlines Flight 87: Takeoff from Shanghai Pudong International Airport to Newark International Airport was delayed on May 21, in order for police to remove an unidentified elderly male passenger who was refusing to let others sit in the seats next to him, claiming it was his way of getting the upgrade the airline owed him. The man was allegedly verbally abusive after they attempted to persuade him to vacate the seats. Passengers were asked to deplane so police could board and remove him. Video of the incident went viral.
- Flybe Flight 107: Shortly after taking off for Amsterdam from Birmingham Airport on May 26, the flight returned to put off Kieran Tabberner, 31, of Hall Green, Birmingham. Shortly after takeoff he had confronted a flight attendant after she left the lavatory, complaining about why she was allowed to use it when he was not. The confrontation grew serious enough that upon being informed of it, the captain decided to return to Birmingham and have Tabberner taken off the plane; the flight attendant was so traumatised by the encounter that she retired afterward. Tabberner was later convicted of behaving in a threatening, abusive and insulting manner towards a member of aircraft crew and ordered to pay £1,550 in fines, compensation and other costs. He claimed he had been denied permission to use the toilet before departure and was desperate to do so.
- A Jet2 flight from London Stansted Airport to Las Palmas on July 6, had to divert to Faro, Portugal, to put off a couple who had begun arguing loudly with each other about a text message; separating them did not quell the argument and observers believed the two were intoxicated. Ronald St Ville, 53, and Pauline Gordon, 66, of Stratford in east London were both charged with endangering the safety of an aircraft.
- Qantas Flight 652: The July 18 flight to Brisbane was forced to return to Perth to put off Luke Taylor, 38, of Queensland, after he became disorderly and allegedly assaulted two flight attendants. He was arrested on arrival; blaming the incident on prescription medication he had taken before the flight. Taylor was granted bail but banned from flying until the case was resolved.
- On an August 21 Eastar Jet flight from Incheon International to Noi Bai International Airport, a reportedly drunk Korean female passenger kicked a stewardess in the stomach after she tried to stop her from smoking in a lavatory. The stewardess fell to the ground as she was trying to capture the evidence on her smartphone. The passenger was handed a sentence of 4 months in prison and a fine of one million won (US$929), but both were suspended for a year due to her reported issues with depression along with acting under the influence of alcohol.
- TUI Airways Flight 182: On October 22, the flight from Manchester to Cancun diverted to Québec City Jean Lesage International Airport in Canada to put off Bridget Hanley, 34, of Blackley. After getting intoxicated, she had fought with both a flight attendant and another passenger; passengers and crew restrained her until she could be arrested by Sûreté du Québec officers on landing. Hanley pled guilty to disturbing the peace, mischief, and jeopardizing the safety of an aircraft After her release she was extradited to the neighboring province of Ontario to face outstanding charges there against her for a drunken-driving incident in June.
- Qatar Airways Flight 962: Shortly after the November 5 flight departed Doha, an Iranian woman who had reportedly consumed a significant quantity of alcohol before boarding pressed her sleeping husband's finger against his cellphone's fingerprint sensor to unlock it, allowing her to discover evidence of an extramarital affair. After she awoke him to confront him about this, flight attendants were unable to calm her, and eventually the plane diverted to Chennai to put the couple and their child off; the flight continued to Bali. Indian authorities questioned them but found no basis for charges; the Iranian family left the country for Malaysia later.
- A November 17 Vietnam Airlines flight from Hanoi to Saigon was delayed during boarding over an altercation between two men on seating arrangements. One of the men, Phuc, gave the other, Dung, a bloody nose during a violent argument when the latter refused to move from his aisle seat. It was revealed that Dung had been allocated a window seat. The two men were removed from the plane and Phuc was fined 15 million VND (US$660).
- China Airlines Flight 835: Three Japanese citizens on a December 8 flight from Taiwan's Taoyuan International Airport to Bangkok were believed to be drunk when they began harassing other passengers, which led the cabin staff to confiscate the purchased alcohol they were consuming. They then began showing signs of wanting to smoke, which escalated to threats and assaults on the flight personnel. The captain decided to turn back to Taoyuan where the three were taken in by police. As a result, the scheduled arrival time was delayed by more than four hours.

=== 2018 ===
- United Airlines Flight 895: The flight from Chicago to Hong Kong diverted to Anchorage on January 4 after an unidentified passenger smeared feces on the walls of several lavatories and tried to flush his shirt down one of the toilets. The FBI took the passenger into custody on landing; he was sent to a nearby mental hospital for observation. United put the passengers up in local hotels for the night; the flight continued to Hong Kong the next day.
- Delta Air Lines Flight 4017: Susan Peirez, 53, of Great Neck, New York, was thrown off the flight from Kennedy Airport to Syracuse before takeoff on February 6 after she threatened to have a flight attendant fired for refusing to have a woman and her baby seated near her removed from the plane, since she believed the baby would start crying during the flight. Peirez invoked the name of New York Governor Andrew Cuomo, whom she said she worked for; video taken by the baby's mother went viral. After the incident she was suspended from her job at the New York State Council on the Arts.
- In early February a Transavia flight from Dubai to Amsterdam diverted to Vienna to put off four passengers, all Dutch, following an altercation that arose from one passenger's refusal to control his flatulence.
- Siberian Airlines Flight 3337: A 47-year-old male passenger on the flight from St. Petersburg was taken into custody upon arrival at Tolmachevo Airport in Novosibirsk in late February after having threatened and assaulted passengers, including children, and crew during the flight. His behavior continued in the cells and he was transferred to a local mental hospital for observation; passengers said he had not appeared to have been drinking on the flight.
- Shortly after takeoff from Kuala Lumpur on March 3, a 20-year-old Bangladeshi university student disrobed and began watching pornography on his laptop. Malindo Air flight attendants persuaded him to get dressed again, but later he attempted to make sexual advances to them and was tied to his seat by other passengers. Upon landing in Dhaka he was taken into custody by police.
- United Express Flight 5449: A woman on the March 5 flight from San Francisco to Boise, Idaho, got up in the middle of the flight and began wandering around, repeatedly saying that she was God, and making other unusual statements. Passengers restrained her with zip ties after she attempted to open the emergency exit during flight. A passenger seated near the woman said she appeared to have been anxious about flying and may have taken some medication; upon arrival she was taken into the custody of the state department of health.
- EasyJet Flight 1975: The flight from Manchester to Paphos diverted to Athens on March 23 when four unidentified passengers became intoxicated from drinks they had managed to smuggle on board. They began arguing with nearby passengers and used excessive language; at Athens they were removed. The flight would continue to Paphos, but the crew were unable to return to Manchester as they had exceeded the hours they could legally work. One of the intoxicated passengers, a 23-year-old woman from Birkenhead, was caught on video.
- American Airlines Flight 2446: On a flight from Miami to Chicago on April 23, Jacob Garcia, 28, of Chicago, Illinois, (who became intoxicated before boarding the aircraft) was arrested for sexually harassing a woman before the aircraft was pulled away from the gate in Miami. Jacob was on midsemester break from his time at Ross University in St Kitts. He also screamed at the woman and her boyfriend and started a fight with them. The boyfriend then called 911 on Garcia and several Miami-Dade police officers were sent on the plane to arrest Garcia. Garcia grew belligerent and tried to fight the police officers; however, Garcia was subdued by the officers after one of them shot Garcia with a taser gun. Garcia was then taken off the plane in handcuffs and was charged with battery, disorderly conduct, resisting an officer without violence, and criminal mischief. A judge also ordered Garcia to pay Miami-Dade Police Department $150 to repair a squad car's windows that was damaged by Garcia. After Garcia was released from prison on a bond, his former legal guardian Phyllis Clark said that Garcia is a straight-A student and he loves animals and his usual demeanor is nothing like the man in the videos.
- Frontier Airlines Flight 864: A 45-year-old man from Boulder, Colorado, was arrested upon arrival in Charleston, South Carolina on May 16. When departing from Denver, he had been seated between two women, one of whom he began questioning about her sex life while consuming two mixed drinks. After she rebuffed him, he allegedly groped the other woman, who had been sleeping until then. The passenger was moved to another seat by himself, after which a passenger across the aisle, who said he appeared to be intoxicated, photographed him urinating on the seat in front of him. After landing, he was taken into custody by the FBI and charged with interfering with a flight crew and two counts of indecent exposure. He was released on a $25,000 bond. The passenger who had photographed him urinating was upgraded to first class for the remainder of the flight, had her baggage fees waived and was given a $200 voucher.
- American Airlines Flight 1293: Jason Felix was arrested May 23 after the flight from St. Croix landed in Miami. During the flight he had grown belligerent after an attendant whom he had previously called a homophobic slur had refused to sell him more beer; for an hour afterwards he and another passenger, an off-duty U.S. Virgin Islands police officer who knew Felix to have a bad reputation, fought intermittently. At one point Felix spat blood at the man. Upon landing Felix was arrested and charged with interfering with a flight crew.
- Jet2 Flight 397: The June 8 flight from Belfast to Ibiza diverted to Toulouse–Blagnac Airport in France to put off an intoxicated passenger who had been verbally abusive to flight attendants. He was banned from the airline for life; it was not known whether criminal charges had been brought.
- American Airlines Flight 862: An 82-year-old man of North Fort Myers, Florida, was arrested after his June 8 American Airlines flight from Philadelphia landed at Southwest Florida International Airport and charged with battery and interference with aircraft operations. He had allegedly struck a flight attendant who was blocking his way down an aisle, used racial slurs toward her and called her too fat to work. After posting $1,000 bond, he was released.
- Delta Air Lines Flight 129: On a July 6 flight departing to Beijing from the Seattle-Tacoma International Airport, Florida native Joseph Hudek began to turn violent after ingesting edible marijuana. According to the accounts, he first attempted to open an exit door, which led to two flight attendants attempting to stop him and signaling for help. A scuffle ensued where he then punched one of the attendants twice in the face and hit a fellow passenger with a wine bottle and his fists. One attendant then grabbed two bottles of wine and hit Hudek with both, breaking one on his head, but he seemed unfazed instead yelling something like, "Do you know who I am?" He was finally restrained by several passengers as the flight diverted back to the Seattle-Tacoma Airport. Passenger Lon Arnold and another attendant were treated for severe facial injuries, with a witness saying that many were filming near the end of the fight. Hudek apologised in court and blamed the effects of marijuana for his violence but Arnold stated he suffered permanent eye damage and a concussion affecting his ability to read and write, and favored prosecutors calling for a five-year sentence. Hudek, though, received more than 300 letters of support from his acquaintances and loved ones (including one from Florida State Representative Janet Cruz), with many stating he was a kind, honorable and nonviolent person. The judge also cited his youth and lack of criminal history to reduce his sentence to 2 years in prison despite Hudek having had previously dropped charges of criminal mischief in 2008 and child abuse battery in 2012.
- Israeli police took a Russian man into custody after his Aeroflot flight from Moscow landed at Ben-Gurion International Airport outside Tel Aviv in early August. During the flight he had been drinking, grown belligerent and attacked crew in the mistaken belief that airline personnel had stolen his mobile phone, which turned out to still be in his possession. At one point he told a steward he would meet him in Solntsevo when they both returned to Moscow, suggesting to some listeners he was part of a particularly violent group of the Russian mafia.
- EasyJet Flight 9025: During the August 2 flight from Luton to Ibiza, a woman began giving lap dances to male passengers traveling with her and exposing her breasts to the rest of the cabin; in return those she gave lap dances to those who rewarded her with drinks. After a while she began doing cartwheels in the aisles, resisting when a friend began returning her to her seat for landing and starting fights with other passengers in the process. The airline later confirmed that an unspecified number of passengers were escorted off the plane by police on landing but provided no further information.
- Country singer Gretchen Wilson was arrested by Connecticut State Police after her American Airlines flight landed at Bradley International Airport in Windsor Locks, Connecticut, on August 21. The incident began with an exchange of words between her and another passenger whom she felt was taking too long in the first-class bathroom; when police attempted to interview her after landing she again became belligerent and dared them to arrest her. She was charged with second-degree breach of peace and released on $1,000 bond.
- American Airlines Flight 2763: The October 1 flight from Phoenix, Arizona, to Boston diverted to Kansas City to put off a male passenger who had grown belligerent after a flight attendant repeatedly asked him to stop doing pull-ups on the overhead luggage racks; he had reportedly appeared to have boarded the plane already somewhat intoxicated and had more to drink on board. Police escorted him off the plane but did not arrest him.
- Justin Brafford, 29, of Denton, Texas, was arrested in New Mexico on October 16, after his Southwest Airlines flight from Los Angeles, California to Dallas, Texas diverted to the Albuquerque Sunport due to his violent behavior. He first assaulted a female passenger, then began threatening flight crew and other passengers. Brafford also threatened murdering every police officer, FBI officer, and other Government employees after being booted from the flight. Brafford was then arrested by FBI agents and was charged with assault and interfering with flight crew, which could lead to 21 years in prison and a $350,000 fine.
- Air India Flight 131: On the November 11 flight from Mumbai to Heathrow Airport in London, Simone Burns, 50, of Hove, England, went into a racist tirade against Indians and Pakistanis after a flight attendant refused to serve her more alcohol. Upon landing she was arrested and charged with insulting and upsetting act, assault, and public intoxication; later she was sentenced to six months in prison and ordered to pay restitution to a flight attendant she spat blood on. Two weeks after her release, Burns died.
- On November 21, Atlanta Police Department officers stormed onto a Delta Air Lines flight that arrived at Hartsfield–Jackson Atlanta International Airport in Atlanta, Georgia from Reagan National Airport in Washington, D.C. to arrest David Toaff, 37, after he yelled out references of Hitler's Nazi Empire, yelling about a Nazi supremacist who looks like Donald Trump, used anti-semitic remarks against Jews, and demanded for all the Jews to raise their hands so he can identify them. Toaff was charged with obstruction and disorderly conduct.

=== 2019 ===
- On January 2, on the United Airlines flight from McCarran International Airport to Newark Liberty International Airport, an unnamed woman started complaining about having to sit between Norma Rodgers and another obese passenger for four hours on the plane and insulting them, making Rodgers angry. The dispute between the two escalated, and flight attendants ultimately removed the unnamed woman from the flight while the plane was still at the gate in Las Vegas.
- On January 4, a WestJet flight from Calgary International Airport to Gatwick was forced to return to Canada after a British man, David Stephen Young, became heavily intoxicated and began attacking the crew and other passengers on board the flight. A month later he pleaded guilty to failing to comply with flight safety instructions and resisting arrest and was fined at least $16,000, including the costs he imposed on the airline for the return to Calgary, an amount likely to increase to as much as $150,000 when passenger reimbursement is included; the conviction will likely prevent him from returning to Canada, where he had been visiting his mother, for some time.
- A January 28 EasyJet flight from Manchester to Iceland diverted to Edinburgh to put off Matthew Flaherty, 44, of Middlewich, Cheshire, who threatened and physically abused crew who attempted to talk to him after he began drinking from a bottle of gin and verbally abusing a female passenger who had been ignoring his attempts to talk to her. After Flaherty began dismantling and eating his mobile phone, the pilots decided to divert. After his arrest, he screamed racial epithets at one of the constables. A year later he pleaded guilty to several charges related to the incident; his lawyer said he was under the influence of painkillers as well as alcohol.
- On a February 1 China Airlines flight from Taipei to Singapore, Taiwanese actor Tuo Chung-hua became drunk and started yelling at the people around him, hurling obscenities to a male passenger who confronted him. He then allegedly touched a stewardess's buttocks. He was arrested once the plane landed at Changi Airport, but his agent denied any allegations of wrongdoing. Tuo later uploaded a video of himself apologising.
- Hawaiian Airlines Flight 459: Four hours into the Seoul-bound February 4 flight, Kyong Chol Kim, 48, became intoxicated and punched a flight attendant, leading the pilot to return to Honolulu International Airport. Five months later he was sentenced to six months in jail for interfering with a flight crew and fined $172,000, including restitution to the airline.
- Ryanair Flight 655: The February 14 flight from Glasgow to Málaga diverted to Madrid to put off a violent passenger. He was taken into custody by Spanish police.
- Another Ryanair flight from Glasgow was disrupted by passenger violence. Police on Tenerife were called to the landing of a March flight to take into custody two passengers who got into a fight during the flight that left them both bloodied. Video of the incident was shared on social media; passengers returning on the jet similarly shared images of the bloodstains still on the overhead bins.
- On June 1 at Tho Xuan Airport, Le Van Hung, a man bound for a flight to Ho Chi Minh City grew agitated after he failed to comply with instructions given by airport staff in charge of security screening and baggage checks. As they repeated their instructions, he began attacking them and threw a security guard to the ground. When other personnel came to assist in taking him to custody, he resisted and struck another one in the forehead, leaving a bloody mark. After the incident, the Civil Aviation Authority of Vietnam banned him from domestic and international flights for a year.
- Aeroflot Flight 2639: On June 14, a heavily intoxicated 36-year-old Russian man caused a disturbance during a flight from Barcelona to Moscow. The passenger became aggressive, ignored warnings from the cabin crew and tried to enter the cockpit. The captain considered him a direct threat to the safety of the flight and decided to make an emergency landing at Warsaw Chopin Airport. Armed and masked officers from the Polish Border Guard intervened and arrested the resisting man. Officials said a preliminary investigation had begun and they consider pressing criminal charges against the passenger. The airline said it would blacklist the man and that it intends to seek the harshest punishment for him, along with reimbursement for costs incurred due to the diversion. It also wants the Russian government to allow additional equipment on board to restrain passengers.
- A June 22 Jet2 flight from London Stansted to Dalaman in southwestern Turkey had to return to Britain under escort by two RAF Typhoon fighter jets, after Chloe Haines, 25, of Maidenhead, Berkshire, grew belligerent and attempted to open the cabin door. Upon landing, she was arrested on suspicion of assault, criminal damage and endangering an aircraft. Before the charges were disposed, the airline billed her £85,000 for the costs it incurred and banned her from its flights for life. Jet2 president Steve Heapy said the incident was "one of the most serious cases of disruptive passenger behaviour that we have experienced". In December she pleaded guilty to assault and endangering the safety of an aircraft; two months later she was sentenced to two years in prison.
- Qantas Flight 516: On the September 22 flight from Sydney to Brisbane, entertainers Lisa and Jess Origliasso were removed by Australian Federal Police after they "refused to follow crew instructions" and were deemed a security risk. The incident started with a disagreement over the way they had stowed their cabin luggage and was reportedly escalated when they took photographs of a flight attendant who they say refused to give them his name.
- Alaska Airlines Flight 411: On the September 26 flight from New York to Los Angeles, the flight was forced to divert to Kansas City International Airport after a 41 year old passenger demanded that he be allowed to use the first-class lavatories because the ones in the economy section were occupied. After being refused, he began threatening the flight crew and attempting to enter the cockpit. The passenger was restrained, and was arrested by local police after landing at Kansas City. The man was charged with endangering the safety of an aircraft and threatening passengers and crew.
- British Airways Flight 263: On a December 2 flight from London to Riyadh, a passenger had a panic attack and attempted to leave the plane in mid-air. He was restrained by other passengers, including the brother of boxer Dillian Whyte, before crew members persuaded him to return to his seat.

== 2020s ==
=== 2020 ===
- United Airlines Flight 4965: On the January 12 flight from Washington Dulles to Newark, a 28-year-old man assaulted a flight attendant. When the plane stopped and the doors opened, the passenger allegedly charged at a crew of responding officers, causing them to fall down the stairs used for passengers and land on the pavement. The passenger was charged with aggravated assault, criminal trespassing, resisting arrest and interfering with transportation.
- American Airlines Flight 967: On the January 15 flight from Los Angeles to Chicago O'Hare, an intoxicated passenger caused the flight to divert to the Albuquerque Sunport after he began kicking seats, assaulting a flight attendant, and taking off his clothes. The man also began spitting gum at the passenger who was filming him and threatening to kill everybody. The plane diverted safely and police at Sunport arrested the suspect and charged him with assault, disorderly conduct, threatening passengers and crew, and intoxication. Other passengers complained that they missed their connecting flights at O'Hare Airport due to the incident.
- United Airlines Flight 933: Crew responding to a lavatory smoke alarm on the flight from Frankfurt to Washington Dulles on February 22 found Dana Ghazi Mustafa, 27, of North Carolina. As they escorted her back to her seat, she began crying, saying she was returning home for a funeral since the rest of her family had been killed in a car accident. Shortly afterwards she again attempted to return to the lavatory; a federal air marshal on the plane saw her strike the flint of her lighter as she did. After she pushed a crew member who attempted to keep her from re-entering the lavatory, the marshal and a partner intervened. She resisted, threatening to stab everyone on the plane and then kill herself. "I'm Palestinian! That's how we get down", she shouted. A half-empty liter bottle of vodka was found in her carry-on. Upon landing at Dulles, she was arrested and charged with assaulting a federal agent, and admitted to an FBI agent that she had fabricated the story about her family.
- American Airlines Flight 927: On a February 26 flight from Miami, Florida to Guayaquil, Ecuador, a drunk passenger caused a disturbance after stealing liquor from the galley, yelling at flight attendants, and urinating in the aisle. Other passengers began talking to him and a flight attendant told the drunk passenger to return to his assigned seat and put his seat belt on. The drunk passenger refused to go back to his seat and a male flight attendant pushed the drunk man. The drunk passenger was arrested by police at the airport in Guayaquil, Ecuador after the plane landed there.
- WestJet Flight 706: The June 14 flight from Vancouver to Toronto, during the COVID-19 pandemic, diverted to Winnipeg due to an unruly passenger. The unruly passenger, Balvir Singh, 59, of Vancouver, British Columbia, took off his mask to smoke on the aircraft. After flight attendants saw him smoking, they told him to stop smoking and to put his mask back on. Singh refused to put his mask back on and decided to continue smoking as he assaulted a flight attendant who instructed him to stop smoking. The plane diverted to Winnipeg and Singh was arrested by officials of the Royal Canadian Mounted Police. Singh was charged with mischief and three counts of failing to comply with flight crew instructions and was also ordered by a judge to pay a fine of $13,000.
- On July 14, three female passengers at Fort Lauderdale Airport began assaulting gate agents after their Spirit Airlines flight was delayed by 76 minutes. The women were seen throwing phones, shoes, water bottles, metal signs, and fast food, as well as kicking and throwing punches at the gate agents, which was all captured on video. In the end, three gate agents suffered minor injuries and all three women were arrested and charged with battery. Spirit Airlines released a statement praising the employees, as well as calling the actions by the passengers "completely unacceptable."
- On October 20, during a JetBlue flight from Kingston, Jamaica to John F. Kennedy International Airport, an unidentified white man wearing a Burger King Crown went into a racist tirade, repeatedly shouting out "nigger" after he saw a black woman sitting in his seat who he accused of kneeing him in the stomach while the plane was still at the gate in Kingston. The man then assaulted flight attendants who tried to stop his tirade and calm him down. He later ran down the aisles of the plane until flight attendants and other passengers were able to restrain him. The man was arrested by local police in Kingston before the flight could depart from the gate and JetBlue permanently banned him from flying the airline.

=== 2021 ===
- On May 23, a woman on Southwest Airlines Flight 700 from Sacramento to San Diego assaulted a flight attendant. During the plane's landing descent, Vyvianna M. Quinonez, 28, punched a flight attendant after being asked to fasten her seat belt, stow her tray table, and wear her mask properly. The incident was captured on video. The flight attendant suffered three chipped teeth and required stitches under her eye. Quinonez was arrested after the plane landed and was ultimately sentenced to 15 months in federal prison and a fine of over $33,000.
- On December 30, a Sunwing Airlines flight from Montreal to Cancun was chartered to carry a group of influencers and reality television stars. The passengers faced controversy over breaching aviation and health regulations. Passengers smoked electronic cigarettes, consumed alcohol, and took off their masks on the flight. The situation became so unruly that flight attendants had to hide from passengers. The behavior was denounced by the Prime Minister of Canada Justin Trudeau who called the passengers "barbarians". The flight is being investigated by Transport Canada. Passengers who were on the flight would be denied boarding by Air Transat, Air Canada and Sunwing Airlines.

=== 2022 ===
- A 29-year-old Galway man was arrested after his January 7 flight from Dublin landed at JFK Airport in New York, having allegedly behaved disruptively and violently for the entire flight. He had refused to wear a mask per COVID-19 protocols and airline requirements, exposed his buttocks repeatedly to passengers and staff, thrown an empty beverage can at a passenger, charged into first class to complain about the food in economy, and remained standing as the plane descended on final approach. He was charged with interfering with a flight crew and intentionally assaulting and intimidating a member of a flight crew and held on $20,000 bail, then sent to Jamaica Hospital Medical Center for psychiatric evaluation.
- In June, during an Air France flight from Geneva to Paris, the pilot and co-pilot had a dispute shortly after takeoff that led to a physical altercation, where one pilot apparently hit the other before the two grabbed each other by the collars. After the cabin crew intervened and one cabin crew member stayed in the cockpit with the pilots, the remainder of the flight was uneventful and the aircraft landed safely in Paris. Both pilots were suspended following the incident.
- In the last week of December, a brawl broke out on a Thai Smile flight from Bangkok to Kolkata. While still on the ground, a flight attendant asked a man to adjust his seat for take-off, but he refused, saying he had back pain. As the flight attendants continued to ask him to adjust his seat, other passengers began complaining, and escalated into a physical fight, with some passengers seen on video hitting the lone person. However, none of the passengers involved were identified and therefore all were allowed to fly back.

=== 2023 ===
- On August 14, Malaysian Airlines Flight 122 from Sydney to Kuala Lumpur returned to Sydney. A man on board was shouting at crew and passengers and also making threats. After landing, the plane parked on one of the runways of Sydney airport, blocking traffic. Police later boarded the plane and arrested the man.

=== 2024 ===
- Two drunk and unruly passengers forced United Airlines Flight UA883, from London to Newark, to be diverted to Bangor, Maine on March 1, 2024. They were removed from the flight and were later banned from all United Airlines flights.
- On July 12, 2024, KM Malta Airlines Flight 479 from Charles de Gaulle Airport in Paris to Malta was disrupted by a drunk man punching a fellow passenger. The man was restrained and arrested upon landing. He received a two-year suspended sentence and an €8000 fine.
- On April 9, 2024, a man in his 30s was arrested due to a "disruptive passenger on board", on a flight from Amsterdam to New York.
- Air Canada Flight AC73 from Casablanca to Montreal on July 26, 2024, was cancelled after an argument between a passenger and a flight attendant, allegedly after the passenger asked for a blanket. The incident, which caused several other travelers to exit the aircraft, escalated to the flight attendant calling police to have the passenger removed. The flight continued to Montreal with a different crew the next day.
- On September 9, 2024, a passenger aboard Frontier Airlines Flight 3581, from John Wayne Airport to San Francisco International Airport reportedly threatened to "kill everyone on board" and attempted to harm two flight attendants. As a result, the flight was diverted to Ontario International Airport in the city of Ontario, California. The passenger was arrested and charged on the basis of interfering with flight crew, facing a potential 20 years in prison.
- On September 23, 2024, a video was posted showing a woman being removed from a United Airlines flight after she allegedly tried to open the emergency door and made racist remarks, prompting the flight crew to make an emergency landing. The video, posted by American musician Rob Thomas, featured his bandmate, Matchbox Twenty drummer Neal Daniels, playing "Frolic", a 1974 song by Luciano Michelini, which is popular in meme culture for highlighting awkward or embarrassing situations, leading to the video going viral.
- On October 28, 2024, a passenger aboard a United Airlines flight between San Francisco and Washington Dulles attacked a sleeping passenger, causing minor injuries. Other passengers were able to restrain the attacker, and the injured passenger was treated by a doctor during the flight. The motivation for the attack is unknown.
- On November 19, 2024, a Canadian passenger onboard American Airlines flight 1915 from Milwaukee to Dallas claimed to be the "captain", told flight staff he needed to exit the aircraft (during flight). He then jumped on top of a 79-year-old flight attendant and attempted to open the cabin door. He was swiftly restrained by other passengers, and bound with duct tape.

=== 2025 ===
- On January 17, 2025, on a Ryanair flight from Lanzarote, Canary Islands to Galicia in mainland Spain, a passenger caused a disruption, demanding a different seat and refusing to produce his boarding pass. He became increasingly angry, and claimed to be a UN diplomat. He was removed from the flight by law enforcement.
- On February 5, 2025, on a Frontier Airlines flight to Houston, US, about 30 minutes after take-off, a man had to be restrained after kicking seats and hitting windows. He was able to break the interior pane of the window, cutting his hand, leaving streaks of blood on the interior of the cabin. He was swiftly tied up by fellow passengers with zip ties and shoelaces. The pilot decided against an emergency landing, and the plane arrived in Houston on schedule, two hours after the incident.
- On March 3, 2025, aboard Southwest Airlines Flight 733 from Houston to Phoenix, a passenger walked to the front of the cabin and began yelling after the plane began to taxi. The woman took off all of her clothes and continued to yell as she walked up and down the aisle, hitting parts of the plane and yelling that she was bipolar and wanted off the plane. The plane returned to the gate, and the woman was transported to the NeuroPsychiatric Center at the Harris Health Ben Taub Hospital in Houston. She did not face charges.
- On March 10, 2025, on an American Airlines flight from Savannah, Georgia to Miami, Florida, less than a minute after take-off, a passenger began yelling and shaking, claiming that a demonic spirit had entered the cabin. He began swallowing rosary beads in an attempt to subdue the spirit. He attacked flight attendants, and was wrestled to the ground by several passengers. His sister, who was traveling with him, reported the two were headed toward Haiti to "flee religious attacks of a spiritual nature". The pilot turned the plane around, and the disruptive passenger was booked into the Chatham County jail in Savannah.
- On April 18, 2025, on United Airlines flight 953 from Chicago to Munich, Art Institute of Chicago president and director James Rondeau stripped off his clothes after he drank alcohol and took prescription medication, prompting a police response. Rondeau voluntarily stepped away from his office while the investigation is completed.
- On July 27, 2025 a man aboard a flight from London to Glasgow began yelling that he had a bomb on board the plane. He proceeded to yell "Death to America", "Death to Trump", and "Allahu Akbar." He was tackled and subdued by passengers and was arrested upon landing.
- On August 10, 2025, a 26-year-old Nigerian woman refused to switch off her phone before an Ibom Air flight in Nigeria but complied after the captain intervened. According to the airline, she later assaulted crew members and ground staff after the flight landed at Murtala Muhammed Airport, before being detained by authorities.
- On Wednesday, August 18, 2025, a Breeze Airways flight from Norfolk, Virginia to Los Angeles, California, was diverted to Colorado and a passenger was removed after waving a skateboard at staff, and breaking free from restraints twice. No injuries were reported.
- On Tuesday, September 2, 2025, on an American Airlines flight departing from San Jose, Costa Rica, a passenger was removed after an argument with a flight attendant.
- On Wednesday, September 3, 2025, on a Qantas aircraft from Sydney, Australia to Queenstown, New Zealand, an intoxicated 50-year-old woman was removed from a flight after dancing in the aisle, ignoring cabin crew instructions, and swearing at staff.
- On Saturday, October 25, 2025, on a Lufthansa aircraft from Chicago, Illinois to Frankfurt, Germany, a passenger assaulted two other passengers, slapped another passenger and resisted to follow the instructions of the crew. The flight was diverted to Boston, where the disruptive passenger was arrested by local authorities.
- On Sunday, December 28, 2025, on a United Airlines flight from Washington Dulles International Airport to Salt Lake City International Airport, a 25-year-old man from Ogden, Utah, walked to the front of the plane and approached a flight attendant, stating "this is a simulation" while waving his hands above his head. He had a small altercation with the flight attendant, attempted to exit the plane, and jumped up and down, throwing punches at other passengers. The plane was diverted to Eppley Airfield in Omaha, Nebraska, where he was escorted off the plane and booked into the Douglas County Jail.

=== 2026 ===
- On May 15, 2026, on a Qantas flight from Melbourne to Dallas, a passenger allegedly bit a flight attendant. A video was taken showing the passenger was involved in a heated exchange with cabin crew by telling them to "fuck off" when asked to move to the back of the plane. The plane then landed at Faaʼa International Airport on Tahiti where the passenger was arrested and banned from Qantas.
- On September 16, 2026, on a Biman Bangladesh Airlines flight from Sylhet to London, two passengers were engaged in a scuffle. A video was taken showing the two passengers exchanging punches and one of the involved passenger's shirt being torn. Cabin crew promptly intervened and defused the situation.
