= Sliding bookcase =

Shelves hiding entrance to a secret room

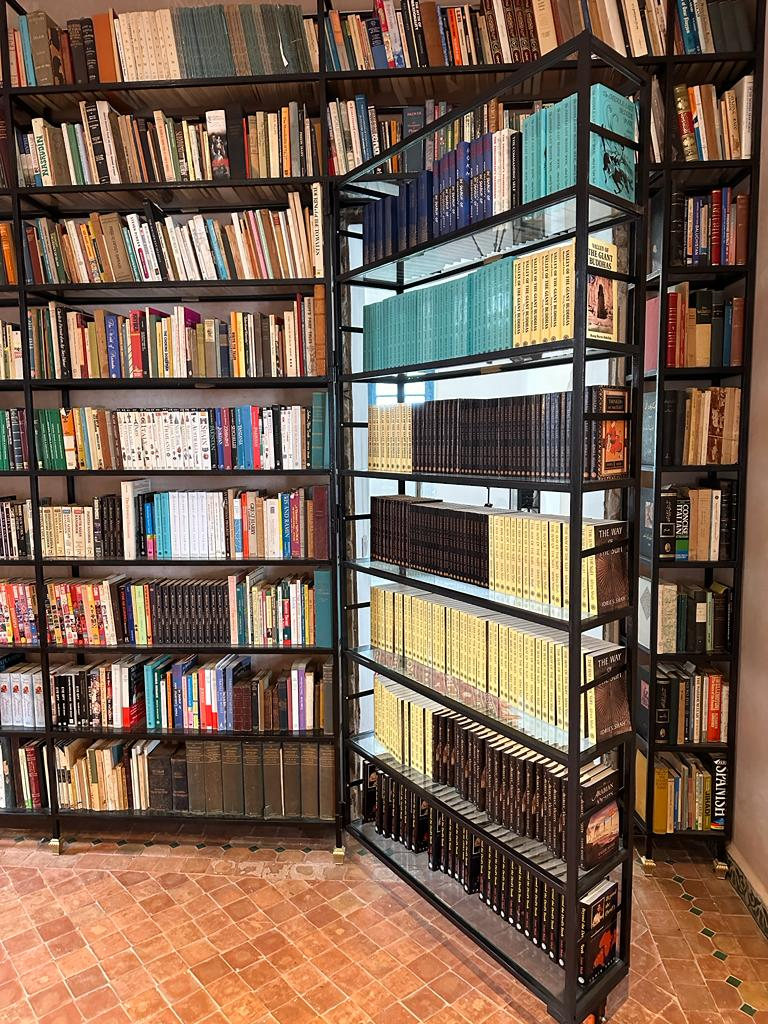
Bookshelves and hidden door at Dar Khalifa, Casablanca, Morocco

A sliding bookcase, bookcase door or Murphy door a registered trademark, is a wooden shelf or cabinet for bound volumes that is designed to move on rollers, a track, hinges, or another mechanism and is typically used to hide the presence of a secret room or space. Sliding bookcases were used in the United States during prohibition to hide rooms or spaces containing liquor. They have also been used to conceal entrances to speakeasy bars and marijuana-growing operations. People have hidden in secret rooms concealed by sliding bookcases to escape detection from a government or police force.

Safe rooms, also known as panic rooms, may be concealed by sliding bookcases. Sliding bookcases may be designed to slide and to swing open using hinges. Sliding bookcases have been portrayed in many fictional works.

== Places with sliding bookcases ==
Sliding bookcases have been installed by homeowners and builders.

=== Anne Frank House ===
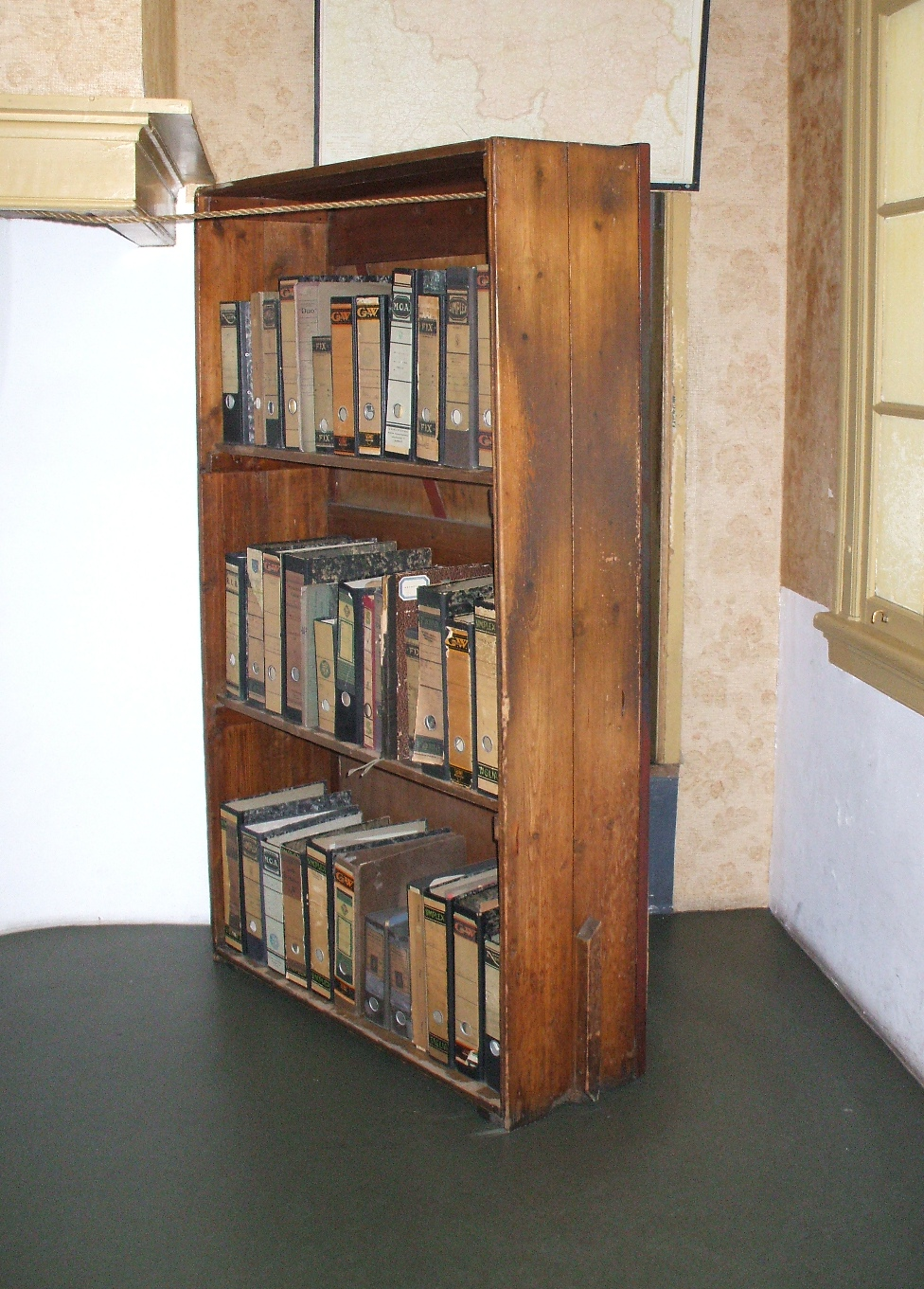
The (reconstructed) movable, sliding bookcase that covered the entrance to the Secret Annex at the Anne Frank House

During World War II at the Anne Frank House, Anne Frank hid from Nazi persecution with her family and four other people in hidden rooms at the rear of the 17th-century canal house, known as the Secret Annex (Dutch: Achterhuis). The rooms were concealed by a movable, sliding bookcase built by Johan Voskuijl. Anne Frank did not survive the war, but in 1947 her wartime diary was published.

=== Bars in the United States ===
==== California ====
The Speakeasy was a theater and club experience in the Tenderloin neighborhood of San Francisco that occurred in January-March 2013 that included the feature of a sliding bookcase that led to "Club 23", a bar and casino parlor. Club 23 was opened after the show, and only "select few patrons" were allowed entrance. Additional entrances included two fake walls.

Bourbon & Branch is a speakeasy-themed bar in San Francisco's Tenderloin neighborhood that has a hinged bookcase that leads to their library. A password is required to gain entry to the bar, and a separate one is required to gain entry to the library.

Marianne's, a bar in the South of Market neighborhood in San Francisco, has a sliding bookcase that leads to a secretive second bar in the establishment named Marianne.

==== Other states ====
The Parlour, a bar in Jacksonville, Florida, has an entrance which is concealed by a sliding bookcase. It also has an unmarked alley door that has a black awning. The Back Room in New York City has a second "hidden" bar within it concealed by a sliding bookcase. The Firehouse Hostel and Lounge in Austin, Texas, has a sliding bookcase that leads to the bar. The bar specializes in cocktails that were consumed during the Prohibition-era, including one named The Last Word, a gin-based cocktail.

=== Bredlau Castle ===
The Bredlau Castle in Lake Elsinore, California has a sliding bookcase that reveals an area used to hide liquor during prohibition in the United States.

=== Hotels ===
The J.W. Marriott luxury hotel in Puxi's Tomorrow Square, Shanghai, China has a sliding bookcase on its executive floor that leads to the building's rooftop.

=== Pixar ===
Pixar's location in Emeryville, California, had a hidden room hidden by a sliding bookcase. It was initially discovered by Pixar animator Andrew Gordon, who opened a hatch door in his office that revealed a hidden room that was designed to provide maintenance workers "access to a portion of the building's ventilation system". Gordon eventually converted the room into a full bar with furniture and carpet, and added a camera in the office aimed at the door to provide warning about anyone approaching. The space was called "Lucky 7 Lounge" and the "Love Lounge". The sliding bookcase was made operational by "a switch hidden in a bust of Shakespeare". The hidden room is shown on the DVD of Toy Story 3 as a bonus feature, which is narrated by Gordon.

== In fiction ==
Sliding bookcases have been a part of many fictional works. Libraries in fiction have sometimes been characterized as existent in secret rooms, hidden by sliding bookcases. A character withdrawing a specific book or moving a statuette as the hidden trigger to open a sliding bookcase is a cliché of mystery stories set in old haunted houses.

The Batman television series had a sliding bookcase that was activated by a hidden switch located inside of a bust of Shakespeare. When the bookcase slid open, the Batpoles that the actors slid down to go to the Batcave were revealed.

== See also ==
- Murphy bed
- Public bookcase
- Secret passage
- Slide Away Bed
- Priest hole
