= Folding bed =

Folding bed may refer to:

- Wall bed, a bed that is hinged at one end to store vertically against the wall, or inside a closet or cabinet
- Camp bed, a narrow, light-weight bed, often made of sturdy cloth stretched over a folding frame
- Sofa bed, a sofa which unfolds into a bed
