= Secret room =

Secret room or secret rooms may refer to:

== Architecture and engineering ==
- Hidden room
- Smaller hidden storage places for valuables and personal belongings:
  - in furniture (see Cabinetry#Compartments),
  - in vehicles (see Trap (car)), or
  - in various other devices (see Concealment device)

== Other uses ==
- Secret Room, a 2013 Nigerian thriller film starring OC Ukeje and Linda Ejiofor
- The Secret Room, a 1969 novel by Marion Eames
- "Secret Room", a song by Baboon from their 2002 album Something Good Is Going to Happen to You
