= Wilder Apartments =

- U.S. National Register of Historic Places
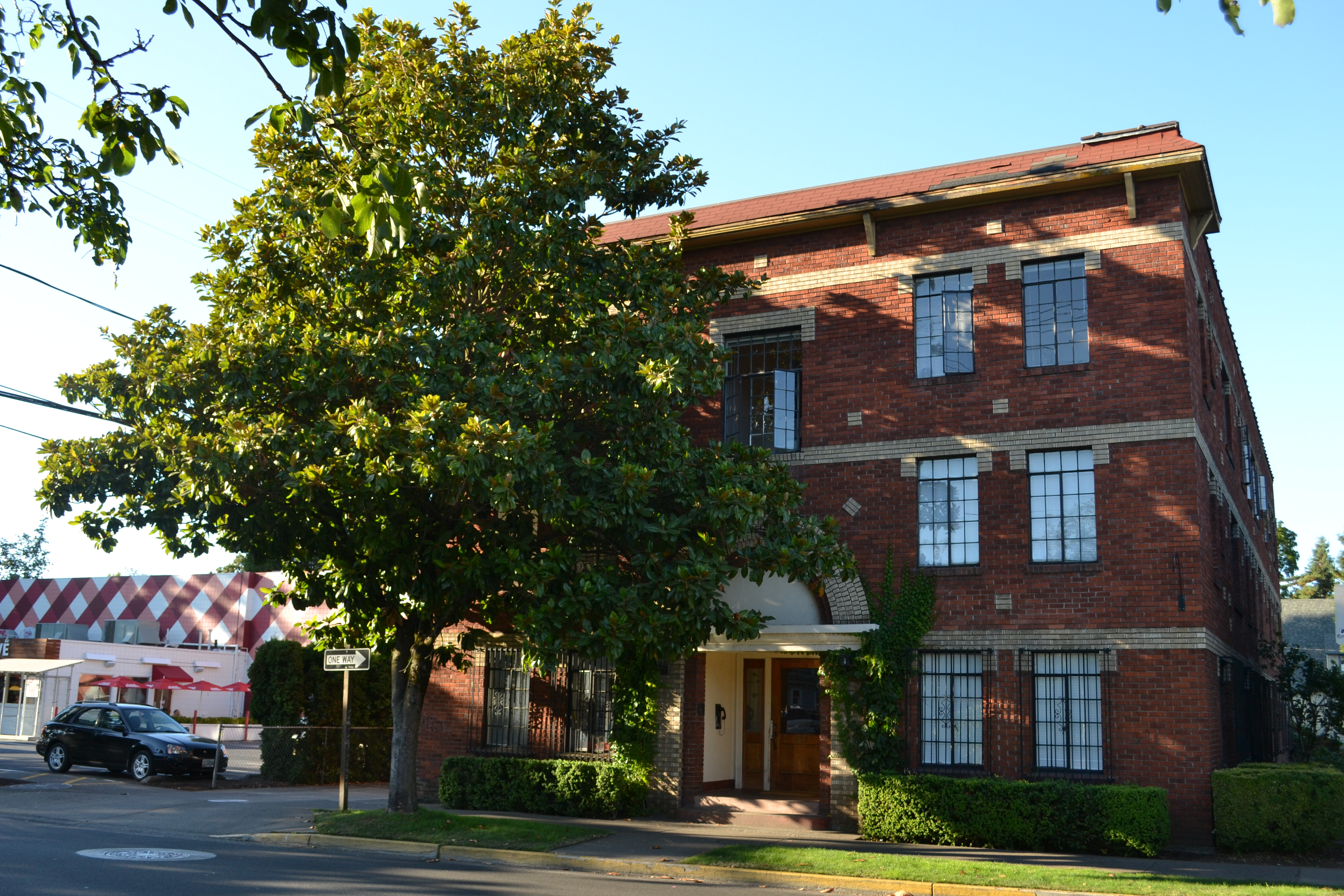

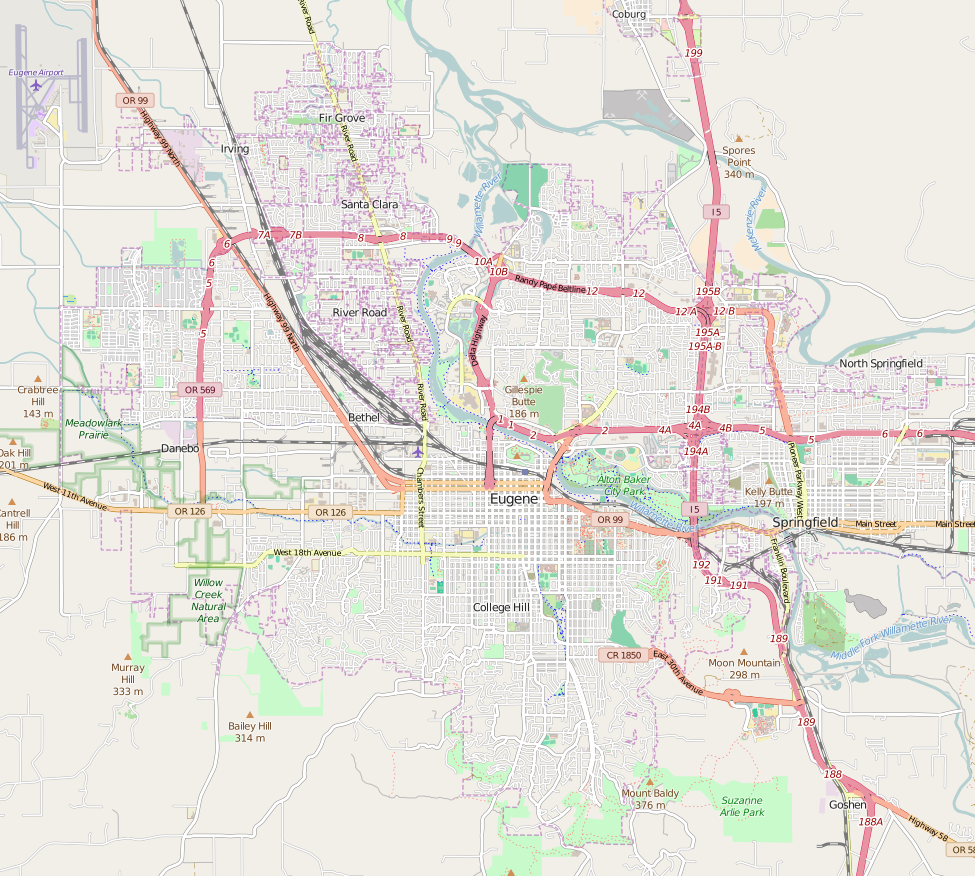
- Location within Eugene OR Location within Oregon
- Location: 259 E. 13th Ave., Eugene, Oregon
- Coordinates: 44°2′45″N 123°5′15″W
- Built: 1927
- Built by: Wilder, H.E.
- Architectural style: Early Commercial
- MPS: Residential Architecture of Eugene, Oregon MPS
- NRHP reference No.: 06000727
- Added to NRHP: August 23, 2006

Wilder Apartments, also known as Emerald Manor, is an Early Commercial-style apartment building in Eugene, Oregon that was built in 1927. It was listed on the National Register of Historic Places in 2006.

The three-story building has 20 units. Each originally had at least one Murphy bed built in.

The Wilder Apartments were found to meet historical significance criteria laid out in a 2000 study of "Residential Architecture in Eugene, Oregon, 1850-1950".
