= Vertiko =

Type of storage furniture

A Vertiko is a kind of vertically orientedstorage furniture. It usually has two panelled doors. Above these, there is usually a drawer and a flat top. Often, it has a pediment as an additional feature.

Most likely its name is due to its inventor, a cabinetmaker in Berlin, Otto Vertikow, who built cabinets beginning around 1860 called "Vertikow". Vertikos have been very common in the Louis Philippe and especially in the Gründerzeit style.

== See also ==
- Secretary desk
