= Ecocapsule =

Egg-shaped mobile dwelling

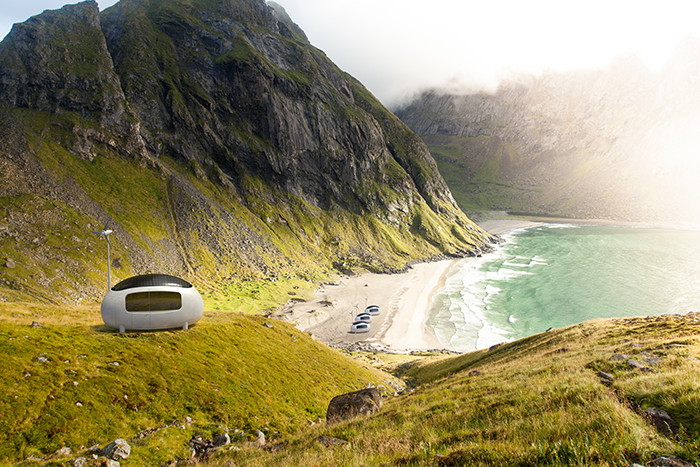
Ecocapsule exterior

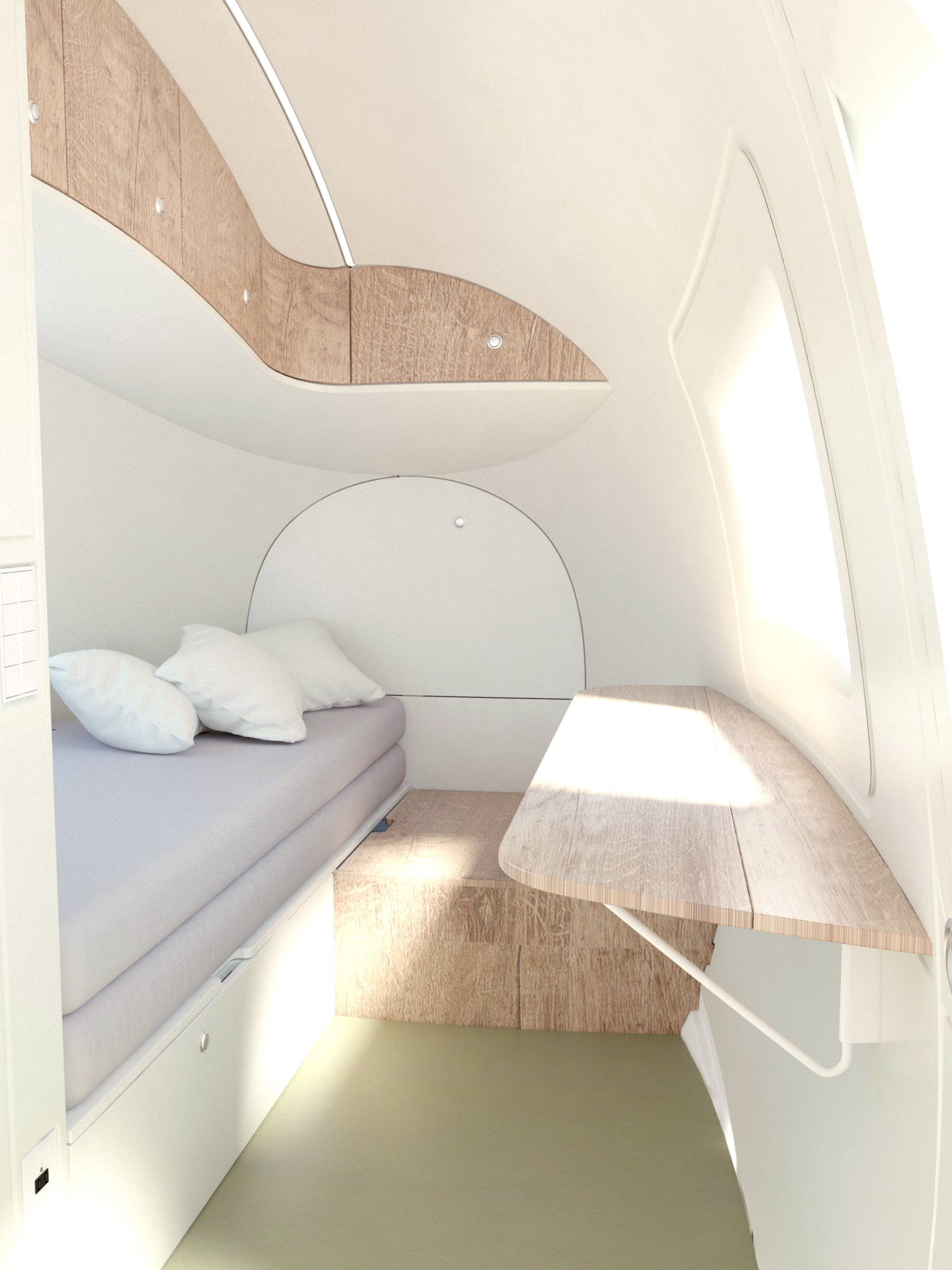
Ecocapsule interior

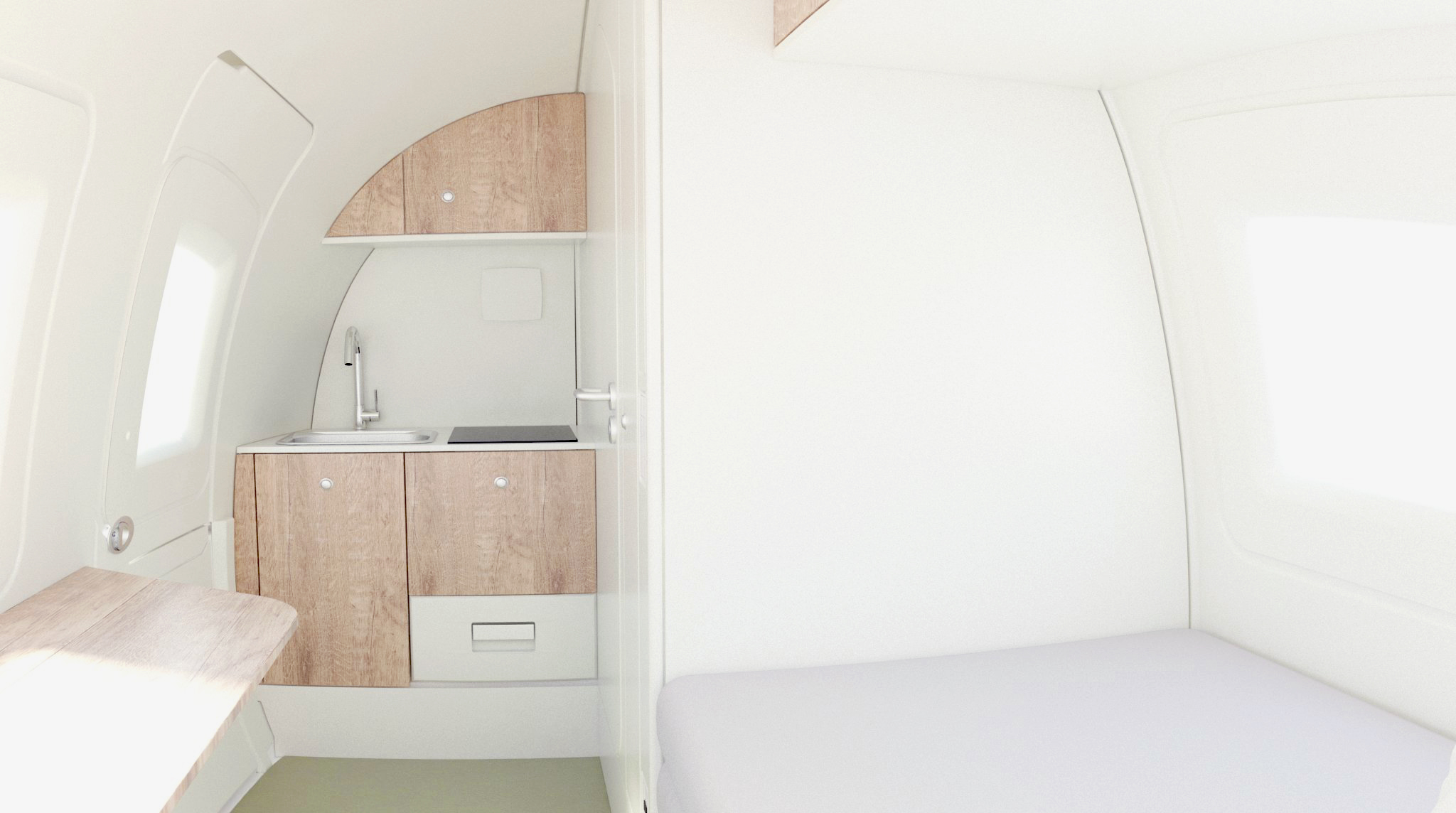
Ecocapsule kitchen and bed

The Ecocapsule is an egg-shaped, mobile dwelling home that utilises solar and wind energy. It was developed by Nice Architects, a firm based in Bratislava, Slovakia. Shaped like an egg to minimize its surface-area-to-volume ratio, its walls are made of two layers of fiberglass with polyurethane foam sandwiched in between. Nice Architects describes the Ecocapsule as a "low-energy house packed into a compact form," although other potential applications include as a disaster-relief shelter, a scientific research station, and even as a "remote Airbnb."

== Dimensions ==
Weighing 2,000 kilograms (4,400 lb) and measuring 4.7 meters (15 ft) in length by 2.2 meters (7.2 ft) in width by 2.5 meters (8.2 ft) in height, the 8.2-square-metre (88 sq ft) Ecocapsule is designed to accommodate two occupants. In addition to providing sleeping quarters for two with a folding bed, it also includes a kitchenette, a shower, a fold-out table, working windows, and even storage space. The Ecocapsule's interior, described by Devin Coldewey as "futuristic but warm," is bathed in natural light and predominantly white in color with blond wood accents.

== Environmental impact ==
The Ecocapsule is powered primarily by a built-in, 750-watt (1.01 hp) wind turbine and secondarily by a high-efficiency, 880-watt (1.18 hp) solar cell array. It is designed to produce more energy than it consumes, as long as the external temperature remains between −5 °C (23 °F) and 50 °C (122 °F). The dwelling is also equipped with a 9.6-kilowatt-hour (35 MJ) battery that can hold four days worth of electrical charge. If the battery is charged, the Ecocapsule diverts some of the energy captured by the solar cells to supplement its water heater. Other energy-conservation features of the dwelling are its high-efficiency climate control system and a heat exchanger that uses exhaust air to warm fresh incoming air.

The Ecocapsule also harnesses rainwater with its 96-litre (25 US gal) reservoir, which is located beneath the dwelling's floor. The water is cleaned via a pre-filtration system and two UV LED lamps. Drinking water is also provided by filters installed on the faucets. The Ecocapsule also features a waterless separating toilet.

The Ecocapsule has a central computer that monitors its electricity and water levels, and can be controlled via a mobile app. The app is also used for controlling all important aspects of Ecocapsule. According to Nice Architects, the Ecocapsule should allow its occupants to live off the grid for several weeks to several months.

== Launching ==
On May 28, 2015, the Ecocapsule was publicly unveiled at Vienna's Pioneers Festival after six years of development. By July 2015, thousands of pre-orders had already been made and interest generated among celebrities such as Susan Sarandon. In January 2018, the company Ecocapsule launched the production of the First Series Ecocapsules, limited to 50 pieces. More affordable, mass-produced Second Series - SPACE by Ecocapsule, was launched in the first half of 2020.

The price of a First Series Ecocapsule is €79,900. The price of the Second Series Ecocapsules is €49,900 . The shipping costs from Slovakia to New York City are around 3,000 euros (about US$3,500), and to Melbourne around 2,500 euros (about AU$4,000). In addition to being shipped, the dwelling is also designed to be transported by airlifting and towing.
