= Bryn Mawr Apartments =

Historic building in Des Moines, Iowa, United States

- U.S. National Register of Historic Places
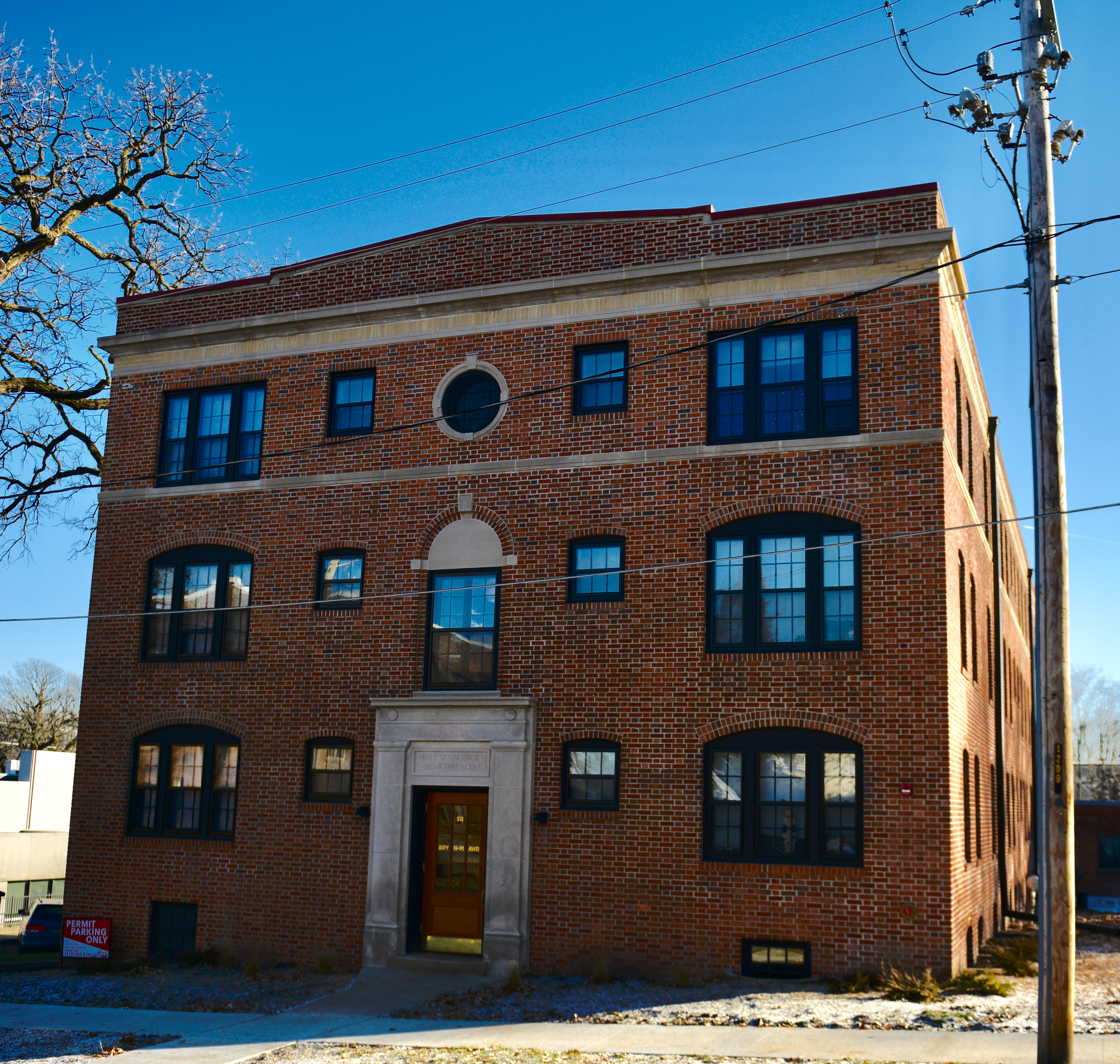

- Location within Iowa Location within the United States
- Location: 511 29th St. Des Moines, Iowa
- Coordinates: 41°35′06.6″N 93°39′22.6″W
- Area: less than one acre
- Built: 1918
- Architect: Proudfoot, Bird and Rawson
- Architectural style: Classical Revival
- NRHP reference No.: 100001699
- Added to NRHP: October 10, 2017

Bryn Mawr Apartments is a historic building located in Des Moines, Iowa, United States. Built in 1918, it is significant as an example of the "kitchenette" type apartment building from the early years of the city's apartment boom. Designed by the prominent Des Moines architectural firm of Proudfoot, Bird and Rawson, "it is representative of the effort to increase profit on residential construction by eliminating the number of rooms in each unit."

The three-story brick structure contains 26 efficiency units. Each floor has eight units with two units in the basement, although one of the basement units is not historic. All of the units feature a combined sleeping/living space, dining room, kitchenette, bathroom, and closets. Historically, a Murphy bed was included in each unit. Each unit opens to the central corridor. In addition to the two units, the basement also includes storage, laundry, and maintenance areas. The exterior features a variety of window openings and a cast concrete and brick cornice. The main entrance is in the center of the main façade features a cast stone surround with pilasters that support a lintel entablature with the building's name carved in it. The apartment building was listed on the National Register of Historic Places in 2017.
