= Oriental Apartments =

Historic building in Portland, Oregon, U.S.

- U.S. National Register of Historic Places
- Portland Historic Landmark
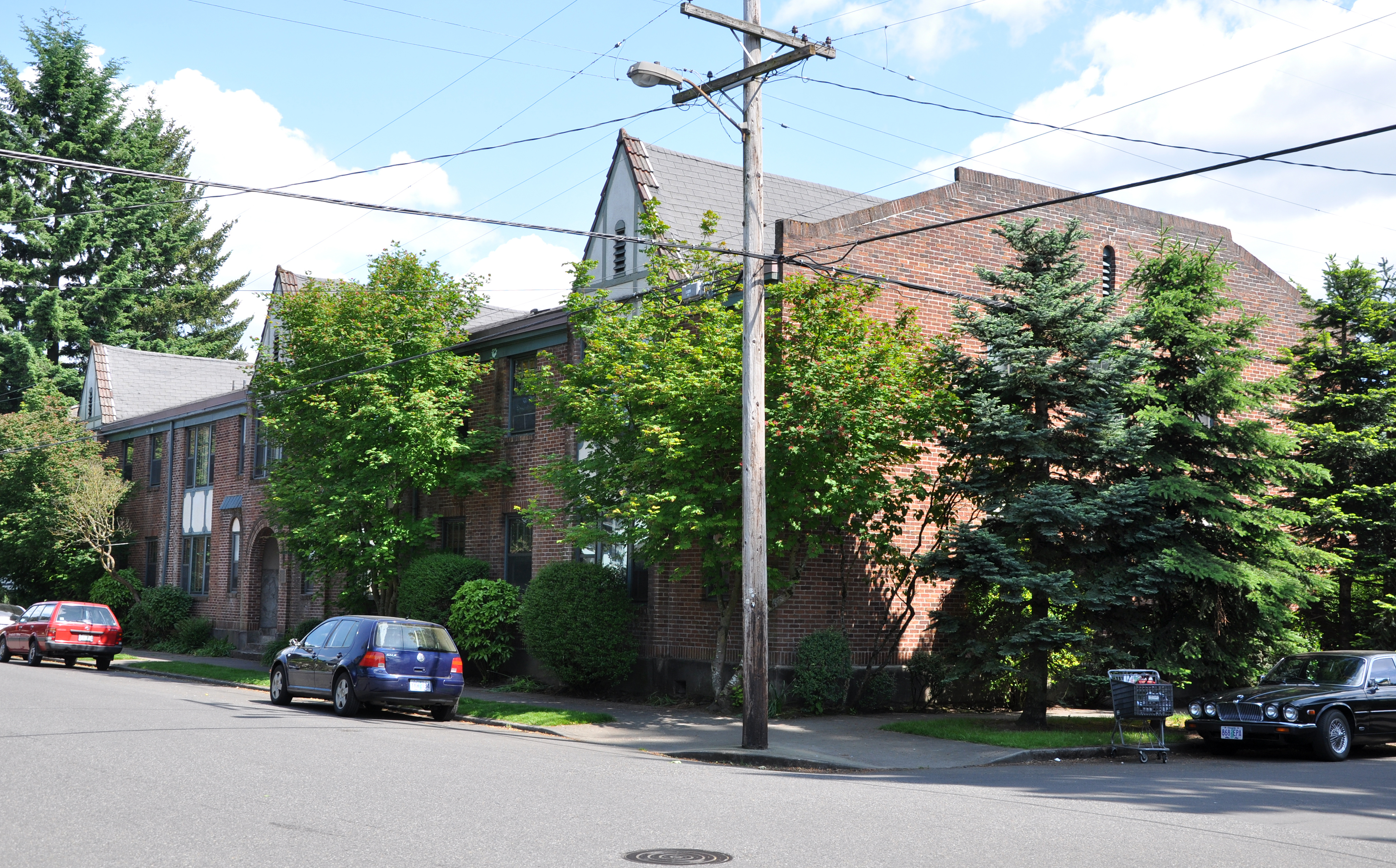
- Oriental Apartments in 2011
- Location: 3562 SE Harrison Street; Portland, Oregon
- Coordinates: 45°30′31″N 122°37′38″W
- Area: 0.3 acres (0.12 ha)
- Built: 1926
- Built by: Curtis A. Gardner
- Architectural style: Tudor Revival
- NRHP reference No.: 92001377
- Added to NRHP: October 15, 1992

The Oriental Apartments in southeast Portland in the U.S. state of Oregon is a two-story multi-family dwelling listed on the National Register of Historic Places. Built in the Tudor Revival style in 1926, it was added to the register in 1992.

Constructed by Curtis A. Gardner, an engineer and contractor, for C.E. Beeman, a real-estate developer, the 12,165-square-foot (1,130.2 m^{2}) structure contains 13 studio apartments with identical floor plans and three one-bedroom apartments, also with floor plans identical to one another. Each story includes eight apartments situated on either side of a central hall running along the long axis of the building. Significant architectural details include its brick exterior cladding, its gables and spandrels, a round-arched entrance portal, Murphy-bed closets, and leaded-glass cupboards that divide the eating area from the food-preparation area of each kitchen.

== See also ==
- National Register of Historic Places listings in Southeast Portland, Oregon
