= Secret passage =

Hidden routes used for stealthy travel

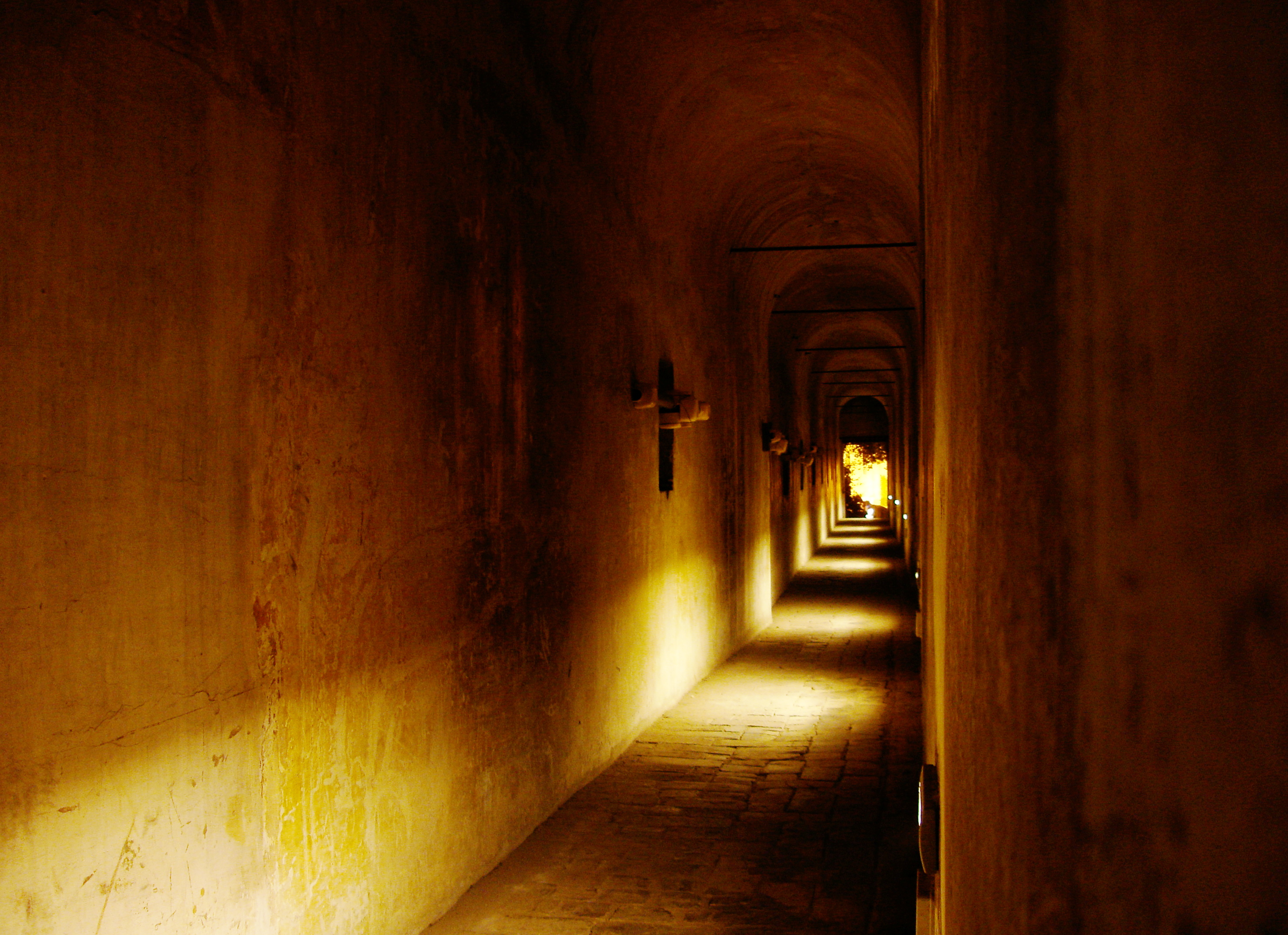
View inside the Passetto, the secret passage between Vatican City and Castel Sant'Angelo in Rome, Italy

Secret passages, also commonly referred to as hidden passages or secret tunnels, are hidden routes used for stealthy travel, escape, or movement of people and goods. They are sometimes found inside buildings, leading to secret rooms.

Others allow people to enter or exit buildings without being seen. Hidden passages and secret rooms have been built in castles and houses owned by heads of state, the wealthy, criminals, and abolitionists associated with the American Underground Railroad. They have helped besieged rulers escape attackers, including Pope Alexander VI in 1494, Pope Clement VII in 1527 and Marie Antoinette in 1789. Passages and tunnels have been used by criminals, armies (notably the Viet Cong in the Vietnam War) and political organizations to smuggle goods and people or conceal their activities.

== Appearance and construction ==
Entrances to some secret passages appear as architectural features, such as a fireplaces or built-in sliding bookcases. Some entrances are more elaborately concealed and can be opened only by engaging a hidden mechanism or locking device. Others are much simpler; for example, a trapdoor hidden under a rug.

Some buildings have secret areas built into their original plans, such as secret passages in medieval castles, designed to allow inhabitants to escape from enemy sieges. Other castles' secret passages led to an underground water source, providing water during prolonged sieges.

Traditional Arabic houses sometimes have a "Bab al-Sirr": a secret door used as an emergency exit built into the walls and hidden with a window sill or a bookcase. The name comes from one of the six gates cut through an ancient wall in Aden (in modern-day Yemen), which was opened only in the event of a state security emergency. In modern-day Spain, the Arab fortress of Benquerencia has a Bab al-Sirr known as the "Door of Treason."

Other secret passages have sometimes been added after initial building. Secret tunnels have often been created as escape routes from prisons or prisoner-of-war camps, where they are known as escape tunnels. They typically require a hidden opening or door, and may involve other deceptive construction techniques, such as the creation of a false wall. Other tunnels have been made for different reasons, such as those used for smuggling firearms, illegal drugs and other contraband.

== History ==
There have been many instances throughout history of secret passages and rooms having been used:

=== Ancient times – AD 1000 ===
Builders of ancient Egyptian pyramids protected the burial chambers from tomb robbers. While some passageways and chambers in pyramids were unknown until recently, they are generally thought to have structural functions rather than secretive ones.

Early Christians, who were persecuted by Roman authorities in the 2nd century AD, used hidden rooms to conceal their gatherings for worship.

=== AD 1000–1600 ===
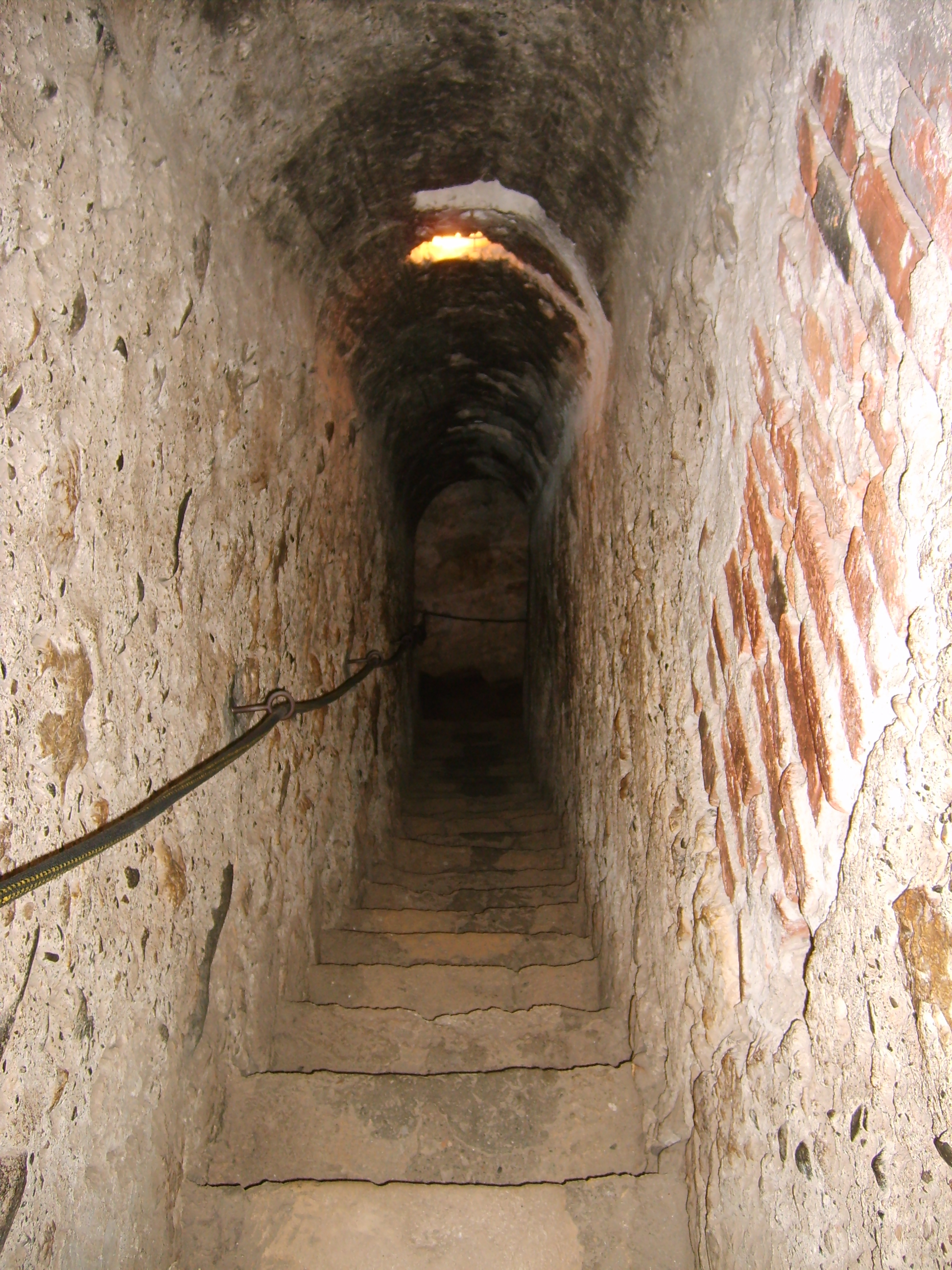
A secret passage in Bran Castle, a 14th-century fortress in Romania

In 1327, Roger Mortimer, 1st Earl of March, imprisoned King Edward II of England after the completion of a coup d'état. Edward II died in custody the same year. In 1330, small group of armed supporters of Edward II used a secret passage to attack Mortimer, who was in Nottingham Castle, defended by several hundred soldiers. The attackers entered through a long, winding secret passage which led directly into the building in which the queen was lodged. An accomplice inside the castle slid back the bolts to the door, which allowed the attackers to arrest Mortimer.

The Passetto is a passage that links the Vatican City with Castel Sant'Angelo. Pope Alexander VI crossed it in 1494, when Charles VIII invaded the city, and Pope Clement VII escaped to safety through it during the Sack of Rome, in 1527.

Catholic priests, in Britain, used hidden rooms called priest holes to escape Protestant persecution, starting from the reign of Queen Elizabeth I.

=== 1600–1900 ===
In the 1730s and 1740s a secret tunnel between The Olde Bell and the nearby The Mermaid Inn in Rye, East Sussex was used by the Hawkhurst Gang for smuggling.

In 1789, at the outset of what would become the French Revolution, angry demonstrators in Paris marched in the streets and stormed the Bastille. The revolution spread to smaller towns, where tax offices were attacked, and to the French countryside, where peasants attacked rich nobles living in manor houses and castles. Many French royalty and nobles fled to Austria, Russia or Britain. In October, a mob of 7,000 demonstrators marched to the Royal Palace at Versailles. Although the mob managed to overcome the palace's defences and kill Marie Antoinette's bodyguards, Marie Antoinette escaped from the palace through a secret passageway.

The Mikhailovsky Castle is a castle that was built to protect the Russian Tsar Paul I from assassins. Completed in 1800, the castle's protective features included massive walls and water on all four sides (rivers and canals), with drawbridges that were raised at night and gun emplacements overlooking the drawbridges. The Tsar also had a secret passageway built into the hallway outside his bedroom to enable him to escape if assailants managed to get past the castle's defences. However, he was never able to use the secret passageway. Forty days after he took up residence in the castle, a group of co-conspirators killed him in his bedroom.

During Japan's Boshin War (1868–1869), the Emperor's Imperial forces attacked the loyal retainers of the shōgun Tokugawa Yoshinobu at Aizu Basin. A band of 15- and 16-year-olds loyal to the Shogun, who called themselves the White Tiger Brigade, escaped from Imperial troops using a secret passageway. When the young warriors emerged from the passageway, they saw a burning samurai residence, which they mistook for the castle. Believing that the castle had fallen to the Imperial troops, the young warriors committed mass-suicide by seppuku (disembowelment), rather than face the dishonor of defeat.

William the 5th Duke of Portland created a network of tunnels on his estate at Welbeck Abbey, during the 19th century, so that he could enter and leave the property unseen.

=== 1900–present ===
The Regal Knickerbocker, in Chicago, Illinois, is a grand 350-room hotel built in the 1920s, during the U.S. Prohibition era. When the hotel was remodeled in 1980, workers found a secret door in one of the penthouse ballrooms, which leads to a stairway down to ground level. This may have been used to help people engaging in illegal gambling or drinking to escape in the event of a police raid.

During the U.S. Prohibition era, illegal bars, called "speakeasies", were often concealed behind, above or below seemingly legitimate businesses designed specifically for illicit bootlegging activities. In Decatur, Illinois, the third floor of Bell's Jewelry Store housed a speakeasy, a gambling den and a brothel, during the 1920s and 1930s. Customers accessed a stairway from the street and entered a sporting goods shop that acted as a "front". After the customers passed through rows of shelves lined with dusty sporting merchandise, a secret panel in the wall was slid open revealing the entrance to the speakeasy and brothel.

In 1928 New York City, Jack Kriendler and Charlie Berns purchased a former bordello and converted it into a bar and restaurant called the "21 Club." In 1930, they hired architect Frank Buchanan to design a secret door to hide the liquor supply in the cellar, as the place was converting to a speakeasy. To conceal the hidden door from federal prohibition agents, Buchanan designed the door so that it would appear to be solid concrete wall. The door, which weighed two and a half tons, was supported by massive precision hinges and faced with a concrete slab. The secret door could be opened only by inserting an 18" length of wire through one of several cracks in the concrete.

During World War II, British Royal Air Force officers held captive in Colditz Castle built a false wall in the attic of one of the POW buildings, to hide a workshop where they were constructing a glider to help them escape.

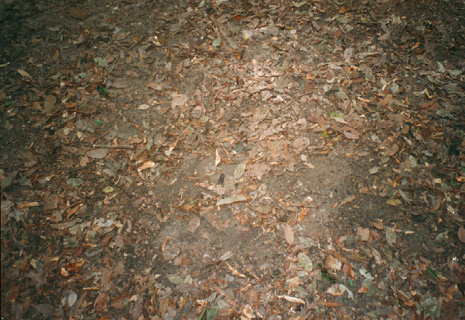
A trapdoor on the jungle floor leads down into the Củ Chi tunnels. Closed and camouflaged, it is virtually undetectable.

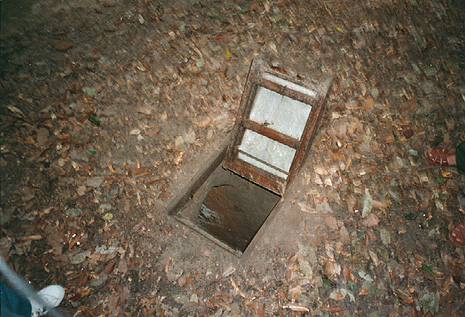
The camouflaged trap door, now open

Guerrilla warfare fighters have used tunnels and secret passages to attack their enemies without being captured and transport arms and supplies. The Củ Chi tunnels were used particularly during the Tết Offensive in the Vietnam War between 1968 and 1969 by Communist Vietcong guerillas, who made these inhospitable but sturdy tunnels their home, and transported supplies for the Offensive that were assembled through them. The tunnels contained sleeping chambers, kitchens, classrooms, wells, and medical facilities. In order to maintain the flow of oxygen from the surface, the Vietcong would cleverly disguise air vents as seemingly natural objects like termite mounds. However, the tunnels were far from comfortable; the Vietcong suffered from many of the elements, such as disease and venomous insects and animals. Particularly nerve-wracking to the Vietcong were the massive aerial bombardment from B-52 bombers, which could usually cave in portions of the tunnels depending on their depths. Nonetheless, the tunnels stood up to almost everything the American military threw at them.

== Recent uses ==
=== North Korean tunnels ===
North Korea has often threatened its Southern counterpart. From 1954, North Korea has been boring tunnels to the South. Up until 1990s only four have been found by the South, but civilian tunnel diggers (남굴사) claim that there are other networks of tunnels under the South. There are reports that the North has exported their skill of boring tunnels to Hezbollah in Lebanon and Hamas in the Gaza Strip. Swedish journalist Bertil Lintner has provided pictures of North Koreans helping the tunnel boring in Myanmar. He is considered the first journalist to reveal the growing relationship between Myanmar and North Korea on strategic cooperation. He has stated that in the 1970s, Sweden exported tunnel boring machines of Atlas Copco Corp. to North Korea.

Four North Korean tunnels have been discovered. The first tunnel (제1땅굴), was found in 1974 in JangnamMyun YeonCheonKun, Kyungki Province; and the second tunnel (제2땅굴) was found in 1975 in KeodongMyun, ChulwonKun, Kangwon Province. The third tunnel (제3땅굴) was found in 1978 in ChangdanMyung, Paju City, Kyungki Province. This one is close to the capital, Seoul and extended beyond the DMZ over 400 meters. The fourth tunnel (제4땅굴) was found in 1990, in HaeanMyun, YangkuKun, Kangwon Province.

=== Palestinian tunnels ===
Hamas and Islamic Jihad have built tunnels across the border between the Gaza Strip and Israel in order to enter Israel secretly, carry out attacks and capture hostages, and return unseen to the Gaza strip.

=== Smuggling ===
On 25 January 2006 a 720-metre (2,360 ft) smuggling tunnel that crossed under the border of the United States and Mexico was discovered. It was used to transport vast quantities of cannabis from Tijuana into Otay, California, for U.S. consumption. It linked two industrial warehouses and was ventilated and well lit. It, and other tunnels, have also been used for illegal immigration.

Between August 2000 and May 2002 more than 1,000 ancient books went missing from the library of the monastery of Mont Sainte-Odile. Stanislas Gosse stole the books after finding an old map showing a secret entrance into the library. The route was not easy, however, involving climbing up exterior walls, a steep staircase and a secret chamber. A mechanism then opened the back of one of five cupboards. The disappearance of so many books over such a length of time confused the librarian, the monks and the police. Gosse was finally caught after he was observed on closed-circuit television.

=== Residential "panic rooms" ===
A small number of contractors in the US and UK specialize in the construction of hidden doors and fortified secret rooms for private residences. These rooms, known as "panic rooms" or "safe rooms", are hidden, secure spaces designed to protect inhabitants in the case of a break-in or home invasion.

The fortified doors and walls protect the occupants so they can summon help using a mobile or land-line phone. Doors and walls can be reinforced with steel, Kevlar, sound-proof or bullet-resistant fiberglass panels. The door to the safe room can be concealed by panels that match existing walls or doors in the home.

== Mythological and fictional uses ==
Secret passages are used as a plot element or as part of the setting in mythological stories, fiction, and in television programs or films. Secret passages in old buildings, castles, haunted houses, and the lairs of villains or superheroes enable characters to secretly enter or exit the building, access a hidden part of the structure, or enter a supernatural realm. These passageways are often opened by pulling a disguised lever or lock mechanism. In some cases, a certain book on a bookshelf serves as the hidden trigger for the mechanism.

=== Mythological uses ===
In Greek mythology, Hyrieus, the King of Boeotia, hired Trophonius and Agamedes to build a treasure chamber for him. However, the pair built in a secret entrance and stole his fortune. In the Hindu Epic Mahabharata, the Pandavas escape an assassination attempt by Duryodhan in the Lakshagraha by escaping through a secret passage they had built earlier.

=== Detective and mystery stories ===
In the late 1890s, detective novels featuring seemingly "impossible crimes" became popular. Impossible crimes were sometimes carried out using secret passages or doors. Subsequent generations of detective pulp fiction and mystery story authors also used the plot device of secret passages.

However, the use of secret passages in detective fiction and mystery stories has been criticised, on the grounds that it is not "fair" to expect the reader to guess about the existence of these secret passages. Ronald Knox (1888–1957), a British theologian and detective story author, argued that the plot device of a secret passage was overused in detective fiction. Knox's Ten Commandments for Detective Fiction states that "Not more than one secret room or passage is allowable." Furthermore, Knox urges that secret passages not be used in detective stories unless the story takes place in an old house or castle where a reader might reasonably expect to find a secret door or passageway.

Carolyn Wells' "impossible crime" stories from the first decades of the 20th century, such as Faulkner's Folly (1917) are often set in an upper class country house, where a murder takes place. There is a closed circle of suspects, all linked to the murdered man; however, based on the layout of the house, the murder seems "impossible". In Wells' stories, the solution to the seemingly impossible crime plots tend to depend on the murderers' use of secret passageways, secret panels, and hidden doors.

Passages figure in several books of the Famous Five series written by Enid Blyton.

Many of the supposedly haunted locations the main characters explore in the Scooby-Doo children's cartoon franchise have secret passageways, tunnels, and halls.

Various secret passages have been depicted in Batman fiction, usually one between Wayne Manor and The Batcave and another for the Batmobile to enter/exit the Batcave. In the Harry Potter series by J.K. Rowling, the ancient castle school of Hogwarts (where much of the action takes place) contains numerous secret and magical passages hidden behind paintings, statuary, and furniture.

=== Games ===
In role-playing games, secret passages, like traps, can be found in all sorts of buildings, especially in dungeons and castles in high fantasy role-playing games. The mansion in the board game Cluedo (Clue) has two secret passages that players can use to move to an opposite corner of the board.

Video games often feature hidden areas, sometimes as an important part of the game and other times as an Easter egg. Such areas can be a required route in order to continue or may be optional and contain rewards for the player, such as a bonus stage, a secret character, extra items or a shortcut to a later part of the game. Some secret entrances are invisible, such as a normal-looking wall that can be walked through, while others give a slight visual clue, such as a cave behind a waterfall.

== See also ==
Parent categories:

- Bolt hole
- Bookcase door
- Rock-cut architecture
- Subterranea (geography): underground structures
- Underground city, umbrella article for underground dwellings and facilities
- Underground living

Secret rooms and passages:

- Ley tunnel
- Panic room
- Priest hole
- Scallywag bunker
- Smuggling tunnel
- Tunnels in popular culture
- London deep-level shelters
- Metro-2

== Notes ==
1. (27 January 2006) "Drug haul in secret border tunnel" at BBC News. Accessed 28 January 2006.
2. (19 June 2003) "Mystery at the monastery ends as CCTV reveals chamber of secrets' daring thief" at The Guardian. Accessed 30 January 2006.
