= Ayrshire Apartments =

- U.S. National Register of Historic Places
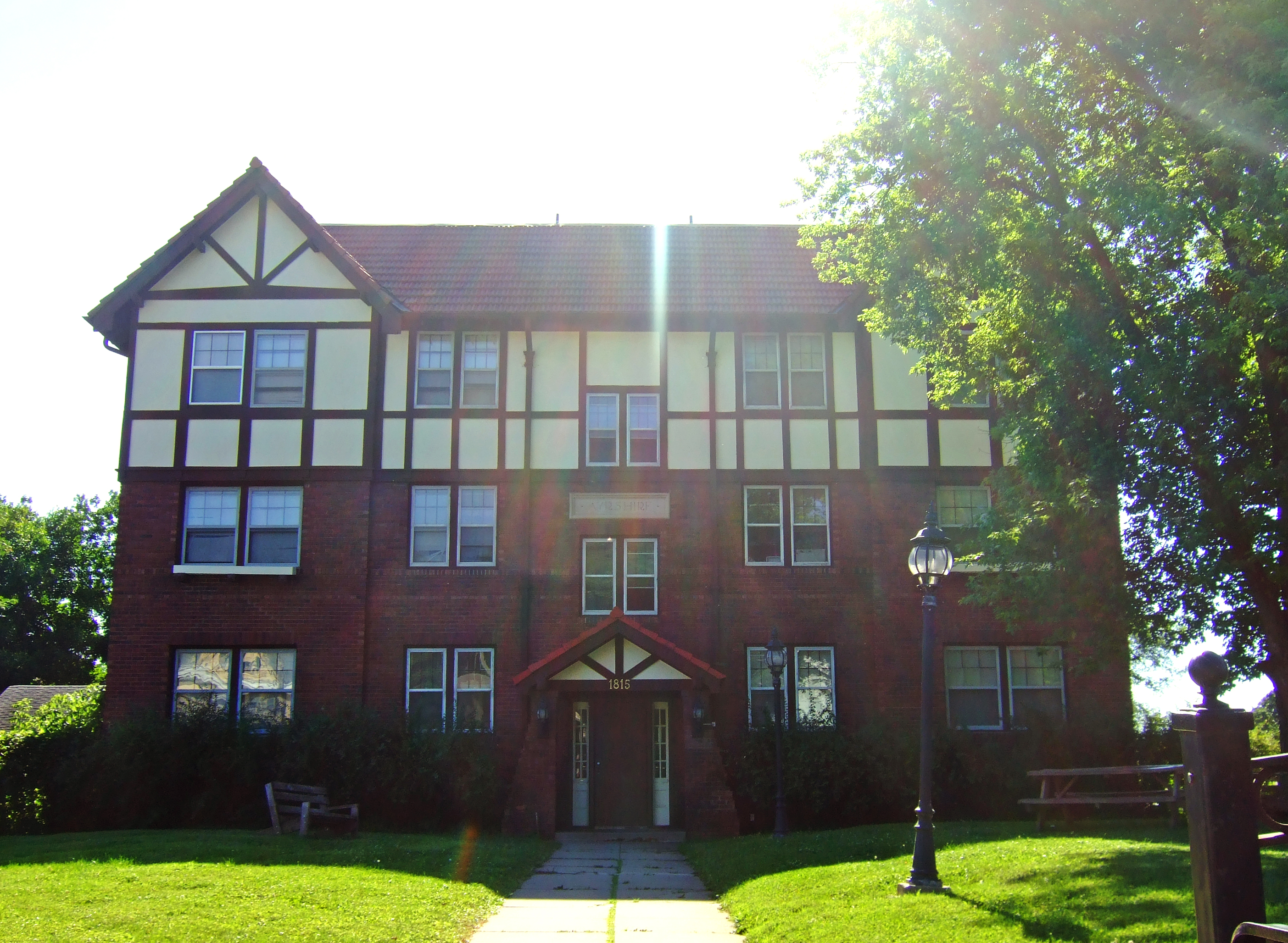

- Location within Iowa Location within the United States
- Location: 1815 6th Ave., Des Moines, Iowa
- Coordinates: 41°36′39″N 93°37′31″W
- Area: less than one acre
- Built: 1920
- Architectural style: Tudor Revival
- MPS: Towards a Greater Des Moines MPS
- NRHP reference No.: 96001144
- Added to NRHP: October 25, 1996

The Ayrshire Apartments is a historic building located in Des Moines, Iowa, United States. It was built in 1920 as a fireproof apartment hotel. The three-story building was designed in the Tudor Revival style, represented by the half-timbering on the third floor. All 36 units include a kitchenette, a Murphy bed in the living room, and a built-in clothes closet. The end units on each floor are larger than the interior units and they include a solarium. The building is located on Sixth Avenue, which by the turn of the 20th century had become a major route utilized by vehicular traffic and streetcar lines. Its proximity to this transportation corridor illustrates the emergence of higher and denser residential use in these areas of Des Moines. The apartment building was listed on the National Register of Historic Places in 1996 as a part of the Towards a Greater Des Moines MPS.
