= Hidden compartment =

Concealed space in a building or object

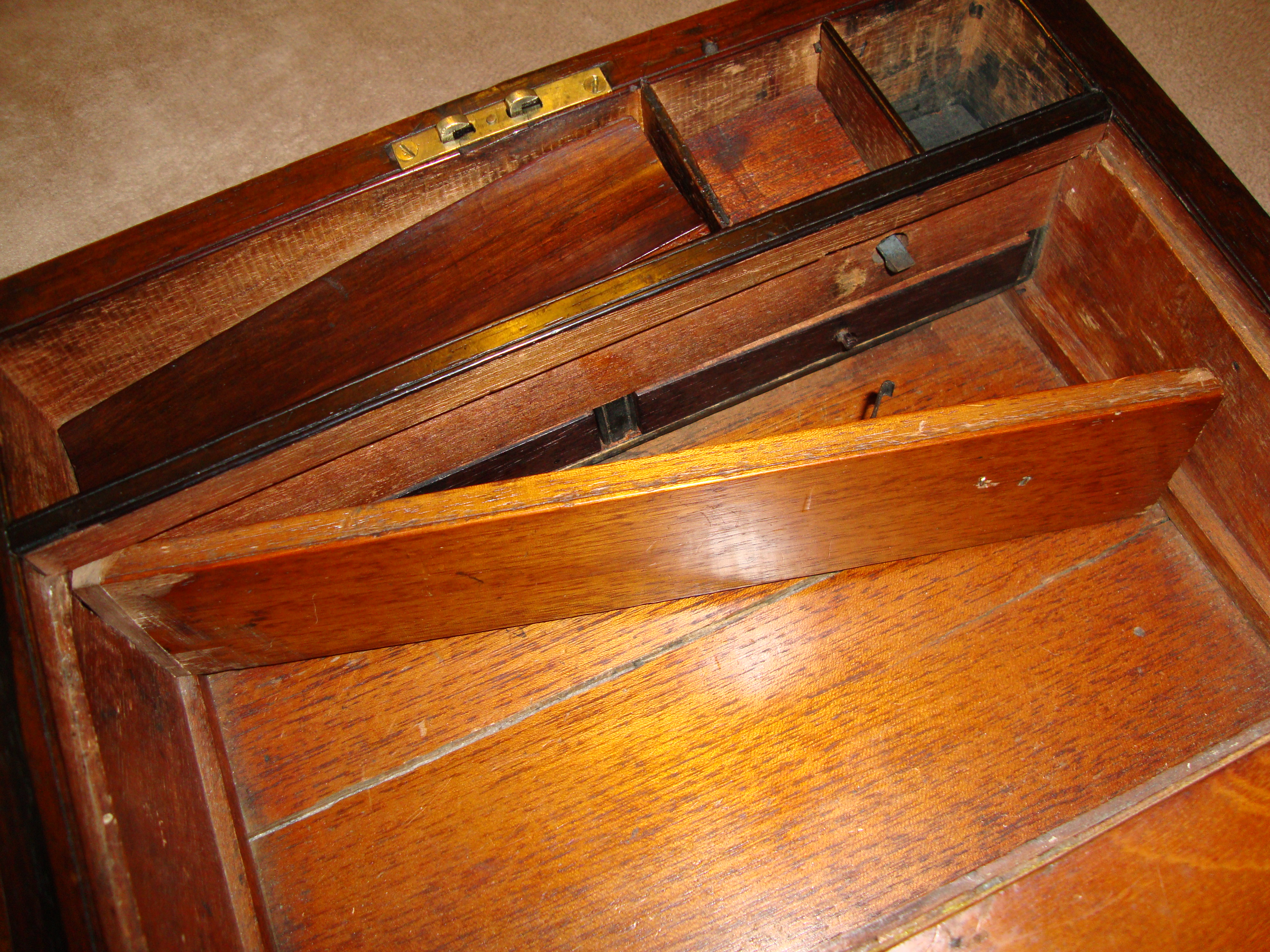
A hidden compartment at the back of a lap desk, with two small drawers concealed beneath the pen and inkwell compartments

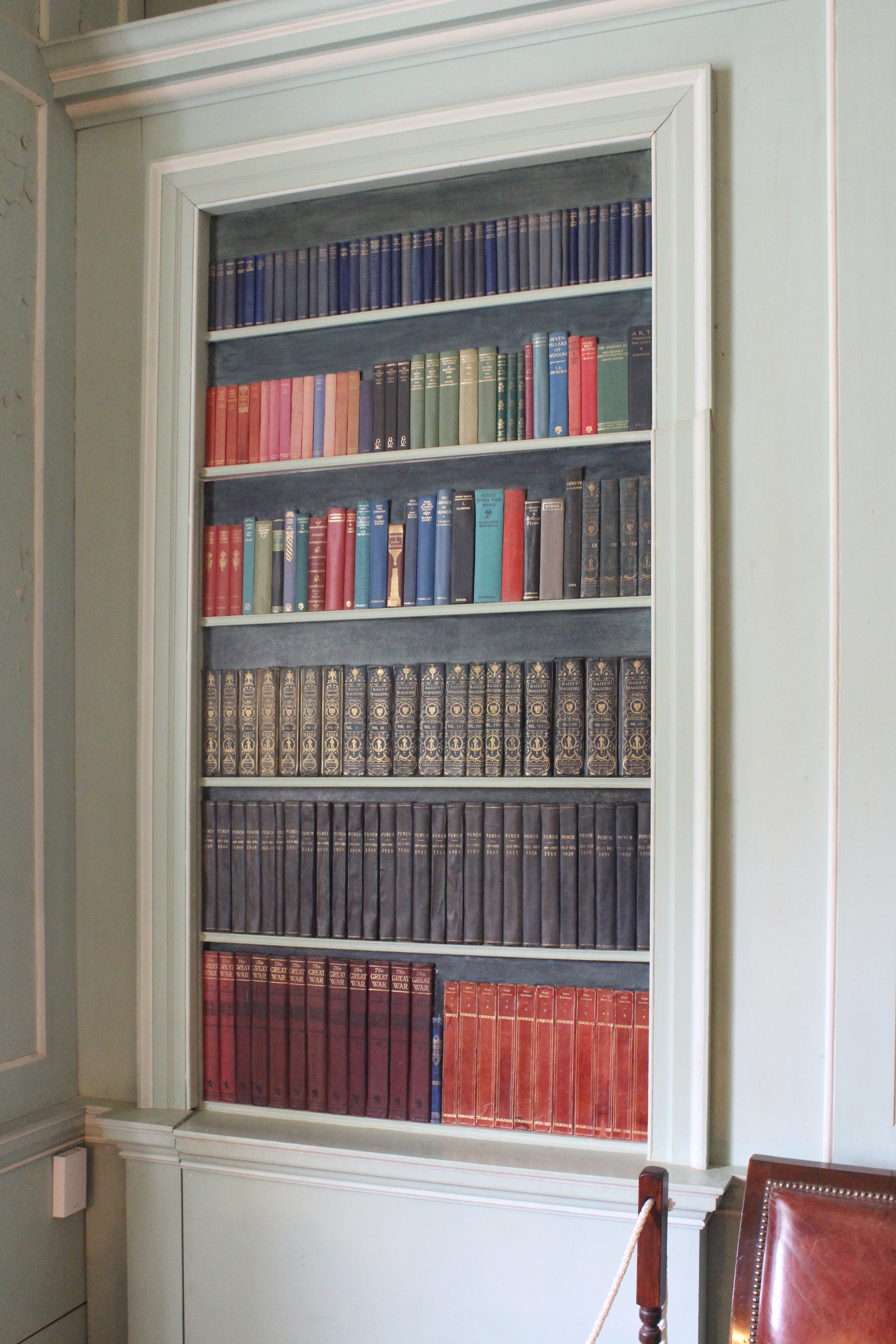
A hidden door between the library and changing rooms at Mottisfont Abbey in England.

A hidden compartment or secret compartment is a compartment whose existence or access is not obvious at first glance, and can be used as a hiding place for objects or sometimes even for people.

A hidden compartment where people can stay is usually referred to as a hidden room or secret room, and can range from parts of small wardrobes or closets under staircases to entire basements or even large mountain complexes. Hidden rooms are often accessed via a hidden door, which for example can be camouflaged as a bookshelf or a trapdoor in the floor. Hidden rooms can for example be used as a refuge, media room, larder or wine cellar.

The term hidden compartment can also refer to smaller storage places for valuables and personal belongings in furniture (such as cabinet compartments), trap compartments in vehicles, false bottoms in containers, and various other concealment devices.

== History ==
In the 1500s and 1600s, hidden rooms were created in British castles to hide Catholic priests; these were referred to as priest holes.

During the prohibition era, there were several examples of hidden rooms being used for storing alcohol or as entrances to secret bars.

In 1978, in connection with the police investigation of Hans Otto Meyer, a secret room was found where Meyer kept weapons for what he claimed was a secret emergency preparedness organization under the Norwegian Armed Forces' intelligence services associated with NATOs Stay Behind.

In recent years, there have been examples of several companies specializing in making hidden rooms, as well as private individuals who have made improvised solutions, either for fun or for security in case of burglary.

== See also ==
- Concealment device
- False bottom
- Mezzanine, an intermediate floor in a building
- Multifunctional furniture
- Panic room
- Priest hole, a hiding place for Catholic priests, built in many Catholic houses during the 1500s and 1600s in England
- Secret passage, a hidden route for stealthy travel, escape, or movement of people and goods
- Tunnels in popular culture
