= Lambing chair =

Style of chair

The lambing chair is a wood boxed form of winged armchair rarely having upholstery. Storage under the seat is common as a drawer or compartment, making it a form of storage furniture.

The historic lambing chair is an example of regional vernacular furniture prevalent in the Lancashire and Yorkshire Dales in England, c. 1750–1850. The name derived from the prevalence of sheep farming in the region where the chair was used by shepherds at lambing time.

The great variety of individual designs found in this group of chairs suggests that they were made by cabinetmakers or carpenters for an individual order, rather than working in the tradition of the turner who made many chairs in the same design.

== See also ==
- List of chairs
