= Concealment device =

Device used to hide something

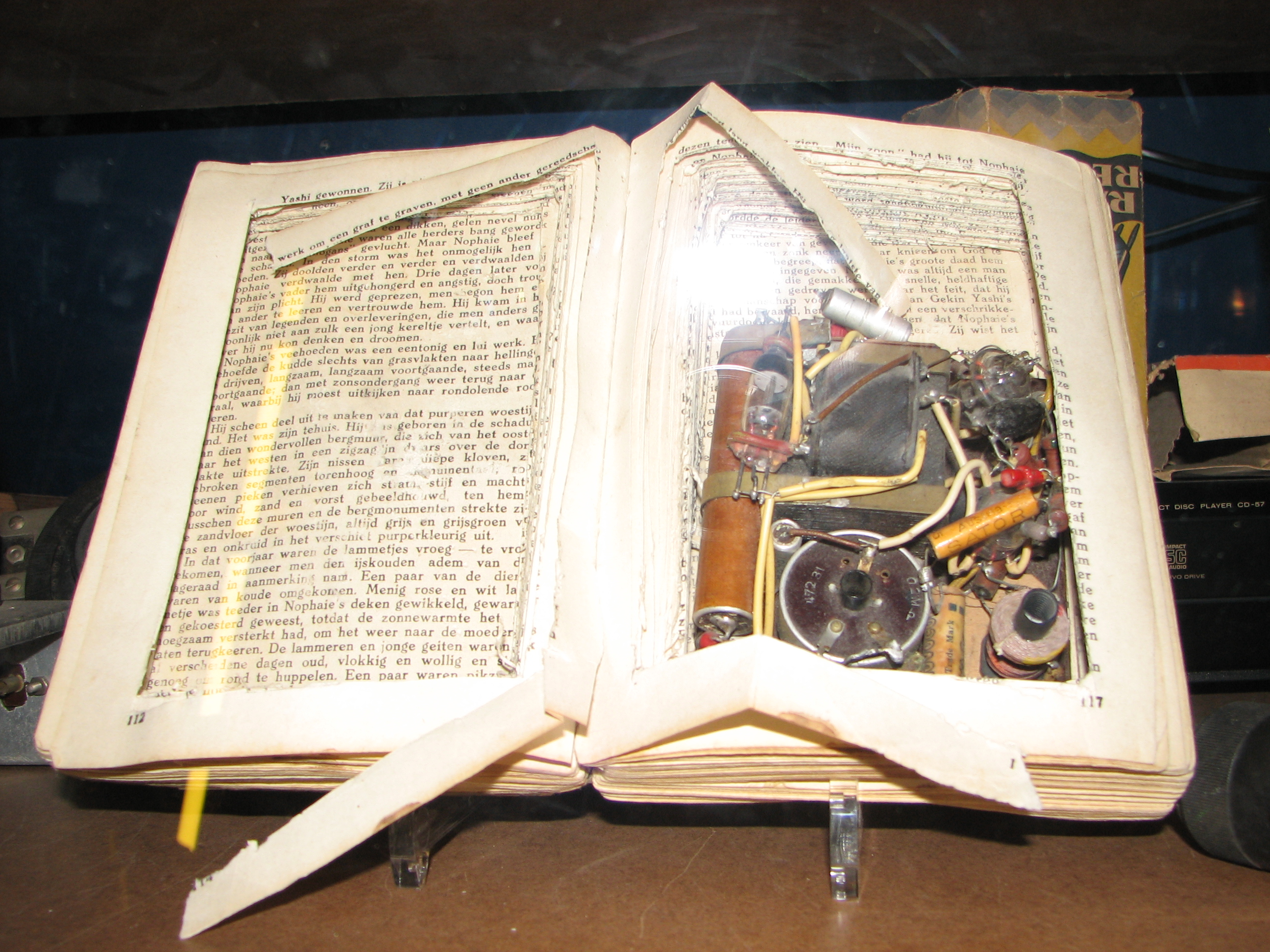
Radio hidden in a book. This was commonly done in World War II by underground resistance cells to hide radios from the German occupiers.

Concealment devices or diversion safes are used to hide things for the purpose of secrecy or security. They are made from an ordinary household object such as a book, a soda can, a candle, a can, or something as small as a coin. The idea is that such an inconspicuous object would not be expected to contain anything of worth.

Examples in espionage include dead drop spikes for transferring items to other people, and hollowed-out coins or hollowed out teeth for concealing something - such as microfilm or a suicide pill. Examples in smuggling include suitcases with false bottoms for hiding contraband.

During World War II MI9 was responsible for creating many concealment devices for "escape aids" to assist prisoners of war to escape.

== Examples ==
=== Ammunition ===
Starting in the First World War and still continuing today, military personnel use ammunition casings to hide small amounts of critical information e.g. encryption/recognition codes or navigational grid references etc. The hiding place is very easy to prepare: the bullet is removed from the cartridge and the propellant powder poured away. A small piece of paper with writing on it can be stored inside. Given that ammunition can be found everywhere in a combat zone, it is very easy to hide or discard such items because they blend in easily. Similarly, if a soldier is captured, the enemy expects that soldiers will have ammunition in their pockets, so little attention is paid, beyond confiscating and discarding it.

=== Books ===
Books are possibly the most common concealment devices in usage. They are easily made and can contain quite large objects. They are also very difficult for outsiders to spot but easy to recognize for those that are looking for a specific book on a shelf.

=== Candles ===
A new type, the hollow candle looks like a large scented candle but is mostly hollow. The bottom comes off and rolled papers or small objects can be placed and hidden inside. Some of the most clever of these contraptions looked like large, ordinary black candles with a felt base concealing the opening. To open them, two metal needles are poked through the felt at certain points and an electric current passed through, causing them to open.

=== Car ===
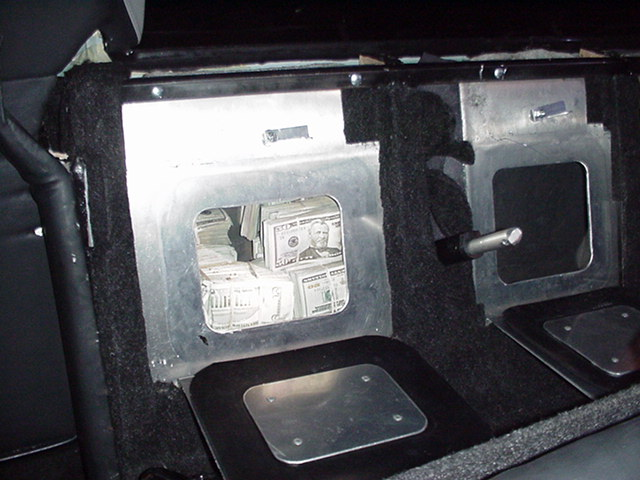
A trap compartment in a car.

"Trap" is a colloquial term for a secret compartment in an automobile. It can be intended to hide legal items, such as handguns or valuables, from thieves. But it can also be used to hide contraband, such as illegal drugs, from searches by authorities.

Until the 1980s, drugs trafficked in cars in the U.S. tended to be hidden in obvious places such as wheel wells or spare tires. In the early 1980s, the first magnetically or hydraulically actuated secret compartments, dubbed "urban traps" by the Drug Enforcement Administration, started to appear – often in door panels, dashboards, seats and roofs. By the early 1990s, however, police had learned to detect such traps by looking for suspicious buttons and switches. More recent traps have no visible controls, are electronically controlled and may require complicated procedures for access. For example, one trap found in the airbag compartment of a U.S. car in 2012 would only open if a driver was in the seat, all doors were closed (to prevent the trap from opening during a roadside police search), the defroster was turned on and a magnetic card was swiped over a sensor hidden in an air-conditioning vent.

The legality of traps is dependent on the jurisdiction in which they are used. In 2012, Alfred Anaya, famous among rich clients in California for his skill in installing sophisticated traps, was sentenced to more than 24 years in prison under U.S. federal law as a co-conspirator in a drug-trafficking operation. The conviction relied on testimony that Anaya had seen one of his clients stash some $800,000 in cash in a trap. The prosecution successfully argued that Anaya must have deduced from this that the trap was to be used for drug trafficking.

=== Cans and jars ===
Water bottle used to conceal radio

A new form of concealment device, mock cans of various household chemicals or food and drinks can be purchased. A wide variety of household products and food containers with removable tops and bottoms are available. Each of these diversion safes are indistinguishable from the genuine product, and can thus avoid detection, and may even be weighted to feel full.

=== Coins ===
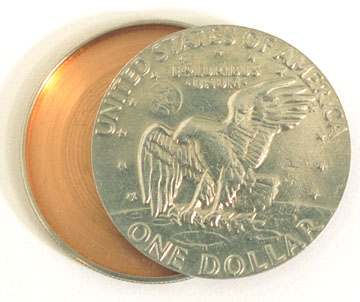
American dollar coin used for concealment

A hollow container, fashioned to look like an Eisenhower dollar, is still used today to hide and send messages or film without being detected. Because it resembles ordinary pocket change, it is virtually undetectable as a concealment device. If a hollow coin is suspected, it sometimes can be easily confirmed by weighing against a normal coin on a simple balance. However, more sophisticated hollow coins have had their weight adjusted to match an unaltered coin by including a ring of a dense metal such as lead inside the coin. Typically coins that have no gold or silver content are used so as to further avoid suspicion.

Such hollow coins were created from two ordinary coins, by milling out one face and the interior of both coins (to create a cavity), and the edges of one (so it could slide into the other). The half coin with intact edges would also have a pin-prick size hole drilled through its face, so the device could be opened by inserting a pin. A scratch may be added to help line up the faces while closing it—although it is very difficult to detect a slight misalignment by casual inspection. A device of this nature was famously discovered by a paper boy in the "Hollow Nickel Case". U-2 pilot Francis Gary Powers was issued with a hollow silver dollar containing a tiny, saxitoxin-impregnated needle, to be used to commit suicide in case of capture by enemy forces.

=== Diversion safe ===
A device whereby a safe-looking safe is left open but has a hidden compartment (e.g., in the door) where small valuable articles can be hidden. As an alternative variant, a safe may be "stocked" with some lesser valuables, with the expectation that it will be burgled, but that the real safe or hiding place for the important valuables will be missed.

=== Electrical outlet ===
A fake electrical outlet, which can be pulled out from the wall and which contains a hidden compartment for storage.

=== Furniture ===
Concealment furniture is furniture that has been specially designed to hide guns and other weapons. The furniture can be made of different materials, but the most popular ones are wood, plastic, and metal. The first concealment furniture was invented in 1939 by John Browning Jr., who was a well-known gun designer. He invented a gun cabinet that could be used as a desk or armoire. It was made with an upper section that could be easily removed to access the hidden compartment for guns and ammunition.

Some concealment furniture pieces are designed for handguns, while others hold shotguns and rifles as well.

=== Painting ===
Thin objects such as papers/money can be concealed in or behind the frame of a painting.

=== Computers and consumer electronics ===
Computer equipment and consumer electronics can easily be used for concealing goods and information. Usually the only tool required is a screwdriver, the device can be opened up, have the majority of the electronic and mechanical components removed and replaced with the goods to be concealed. Some of the more common devices used for this purpose are video players such as VHS, CD, DVD and Blu-ray players, computer accessories such as DVD-ROM drives and hard disk drives, battery packs or even a laptop computer itself. More often than not, the majority of the components will be removed to allow more space to conceal an item, but that will render the device inoperable and may arouse suspicion, and it may be of more benefit to preserve the operation of the device at the sacrifice of space. Additionally, the electronic device itself may be subject to theft, thereby defeating the purpose of such a concealment device. In other cases, items may be stored in parts of the machine without having to render it unusable - free space in the form of caddies that would normally be occupied by secondary and tertiary hard drives or disk drives can be large enough to store small items such as money and other valuables.

== See also ==
- Hidden compartment
- Rudolf Abel
