= Multifunctional furniture =

Furniture with several functions

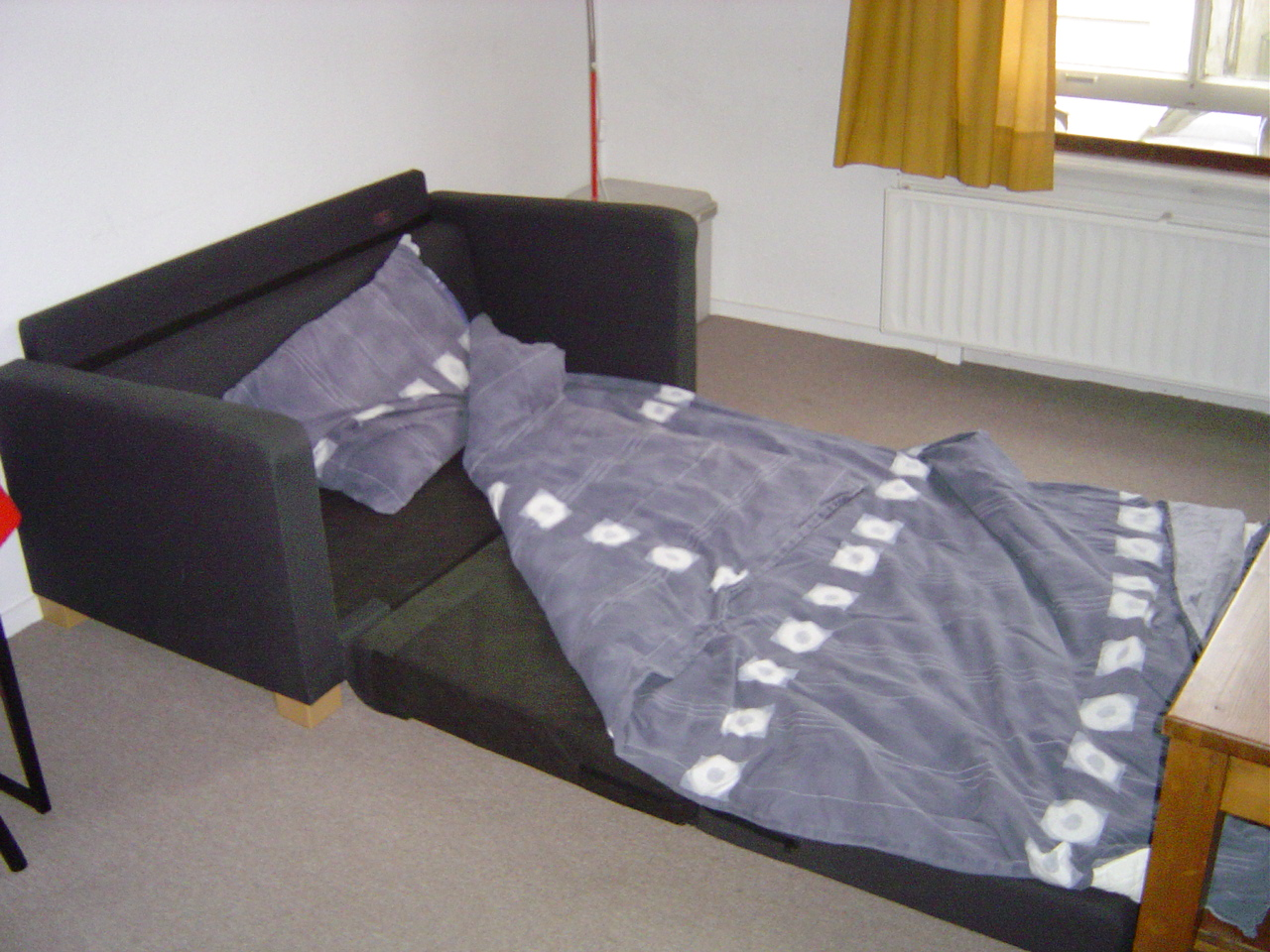
A sofa bed unfolded from a couch into a bed

Multifunctional furniture is furniture with several functions combined. The functions combined vary, but a common variant is to incorporate an extra storage function into chair, tables, and so forth, making them so-called storage furniture. It more efficiently uses up living space. Lack of space can be an important reason for choosing such furniture, but combination furniture is also seen in larger homes for more space-efficient utilization. Historically, furniture with transforming mechanisms was called "mechanical furniture".

== Examples ==
Some common examples of multifunctional furniture are:

- Chair-table, a table where the tabletop can be hinged to form the back of a seat to serve as a chair, if necessary
- Chest-chair, a type of chair where the seat doubles as the lid of a chest for storage
- Chest-table, a chest used as a table, with storage space underneath a hinged tabletop. Today more commonly seen as coffee tables, since people's legs do not usually rest underneath such tables.
- Coffee table with extra storage on their underside is a type of multifunctional furniture
- Daybed, a combination furniture that can be used as a bed, for sitting, or for rest and relaxation in common rooms
- Lambing chair, a type of chair commonly with storage under the seat in form of a drawer
- Monks bench, a table/bench
- Ottoman, a stool where the seat often is hinged with a hollow inside that can be used for storage
- Pull-down bed, a folding bed that is hinged on one end so that it can be stored vertically against a wall or inside a cupboard
- Recliner, a chair that can be folded out to a near supine position for sleeping
- Storage bed, a bed with built in storage
- Sofa bed, a sofa where the seating area can be pulled or folded out to form a bed for sleeping
- Storage bench, a bench where there is storage beneath the seat
- Step chair and onit chair (the latter has an ironing-board mode)
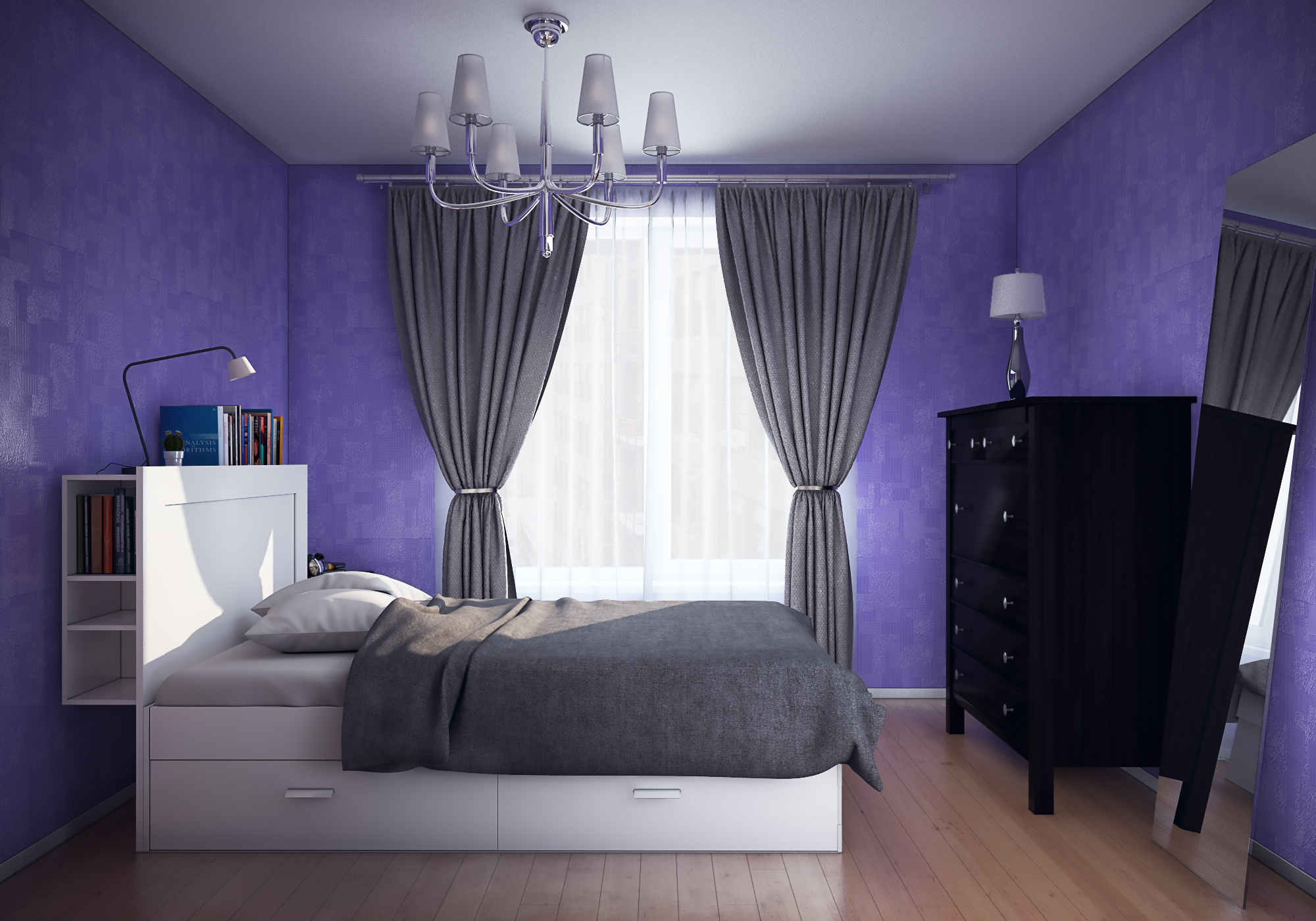
A storage bed with a white bed frame and drawers

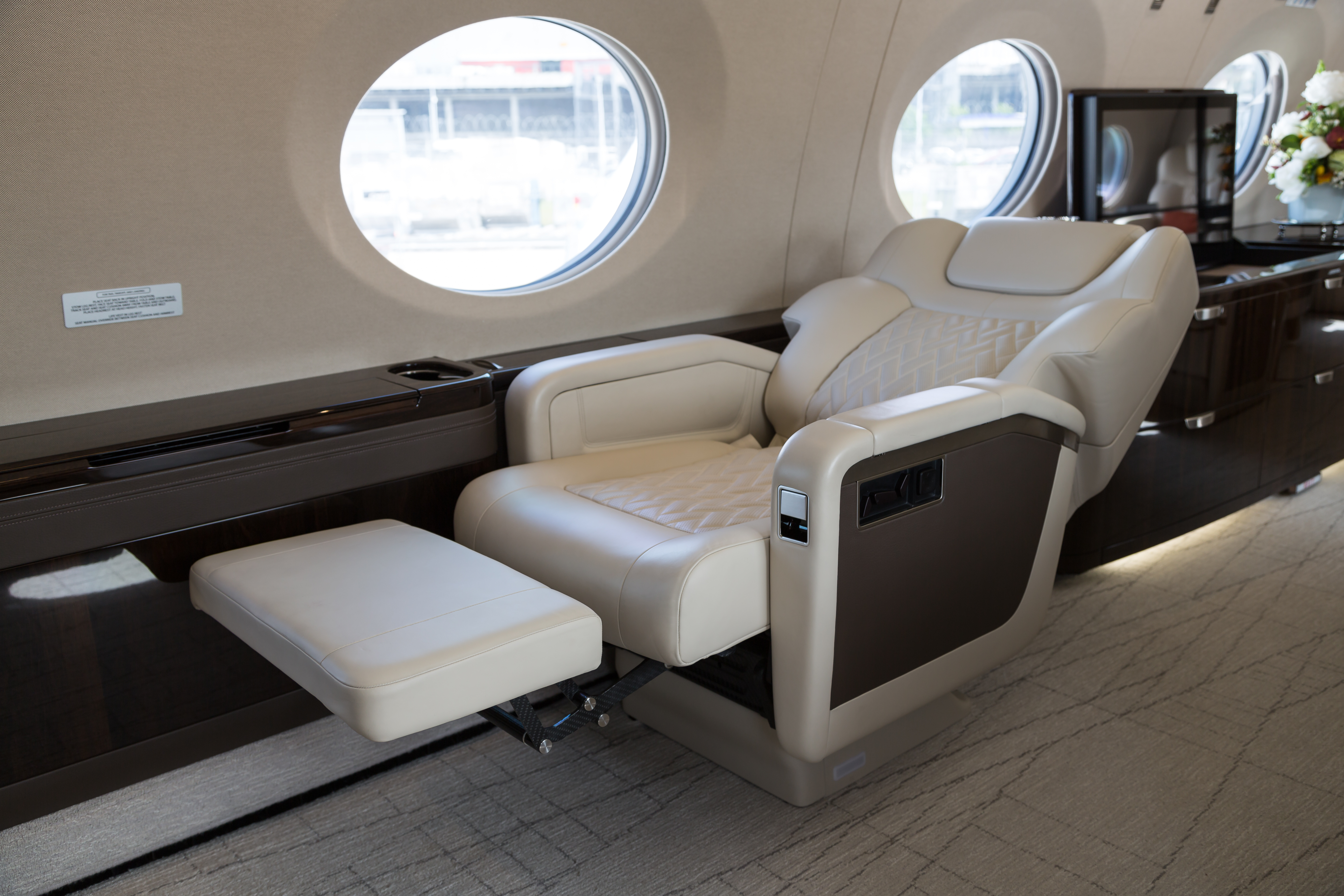
A recliner in a position that can accommodate for sleeping

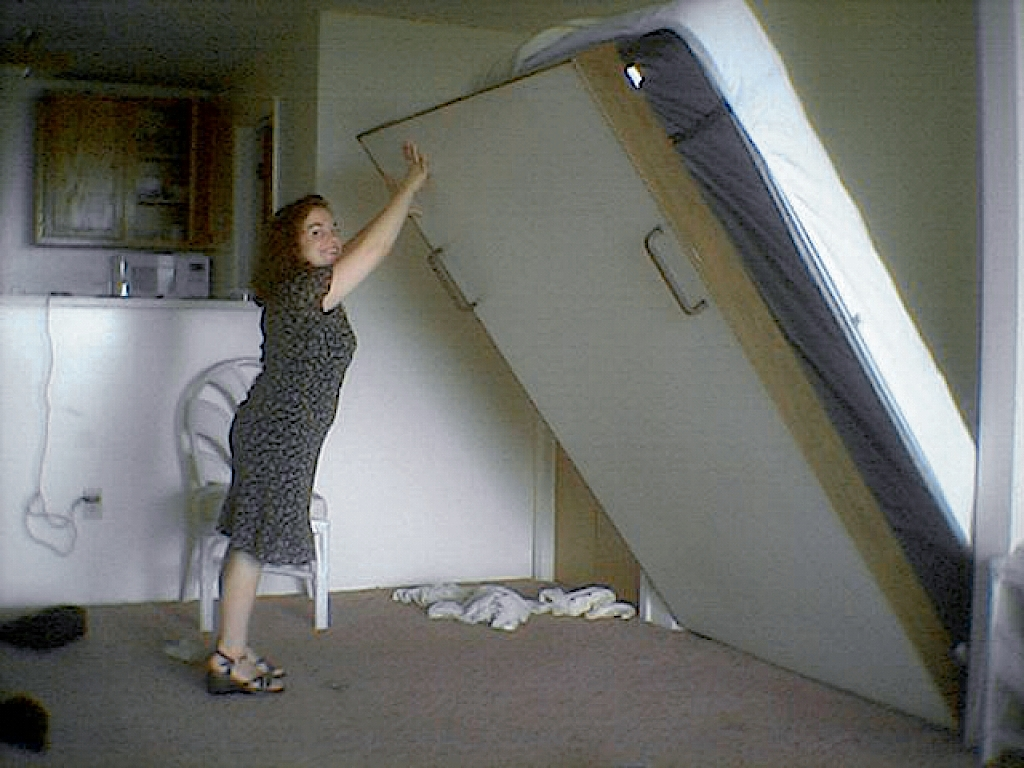
Folding a pull-down bed

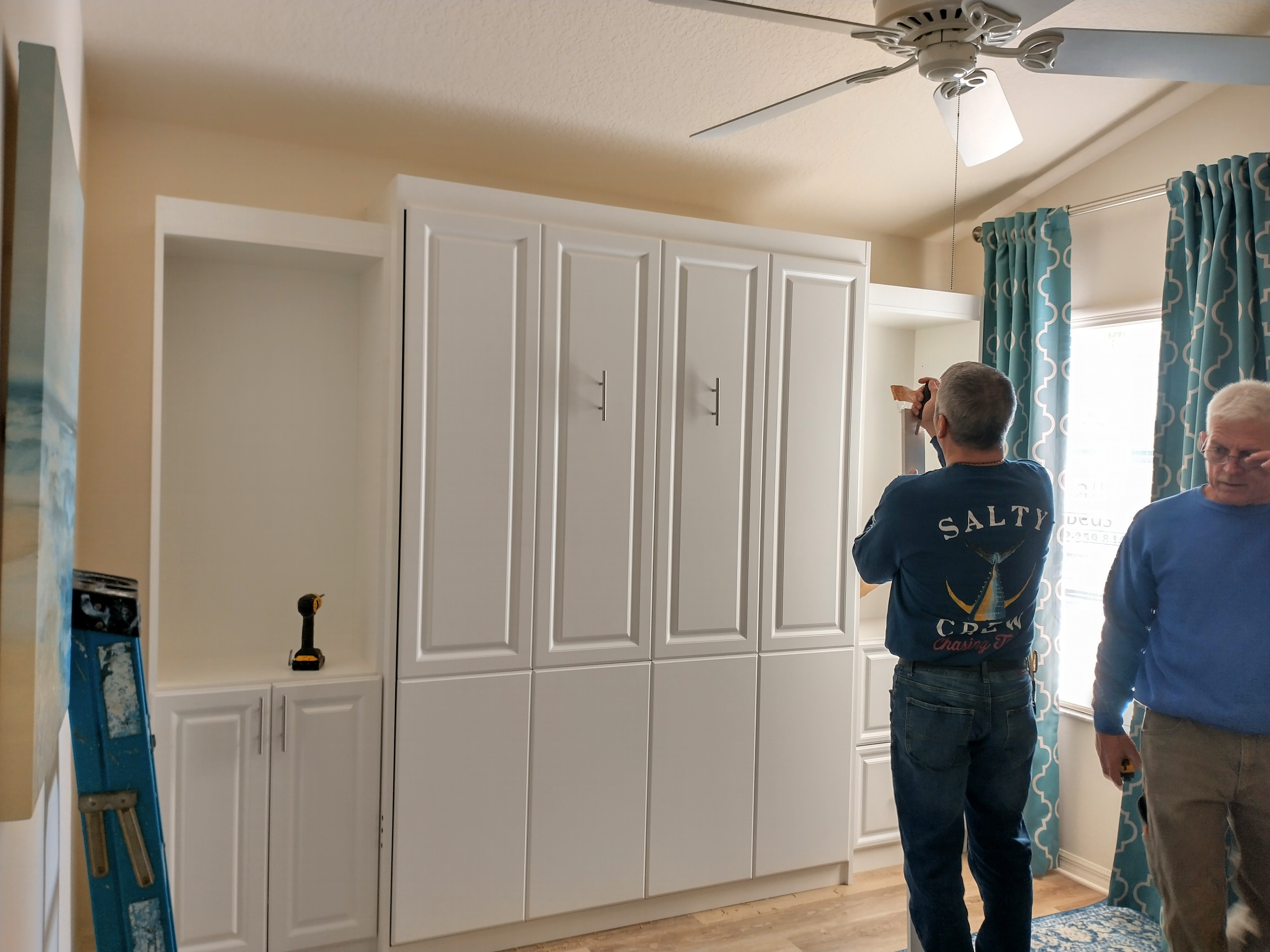
Workers installing a pull-down bed

== See also ==
- Hidden compartment
- Modern furniture
- Overhead storage, space-saving storage that frees up floor space and utilizes room volume
- Category:Mechanical furniture
- Category:Portable furniture

== Literature ==
- Møbler i Norge (1976) by Trond Juul Gjerdi
