= False bottom =

Secret partition in a container

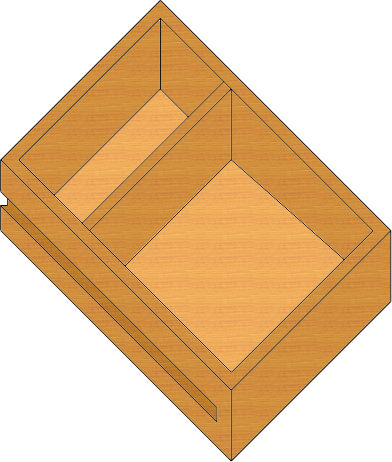
Drawing of a drawer with a false back

A false bottom (or false back) is an internal partition in a container, typically at the bottom of a drawer, suitcase or similar item, enabling the concealment of objects from a cursory examination of the item's contents. A false bottom may be present if the internal dimensions of a container do not match its external dimensions after taking into account the thicknesses of constituent materials and structures used to build the object.

The term false bottom can also refer to the deep scattering layer in the ocean, a phenomenon where a layer of marine organisms deep in the ocean can be mistaken by sonar for the seabed. In Polar research, the false bottom refers to the type of thin sea ice which is formed underwater at the interface of low-salinity meltwater and saline seawater, typically during summer season.

== See also ==
- Concealment device
- Drawer (furniture)
