= Safe room =

Fortified room in a building

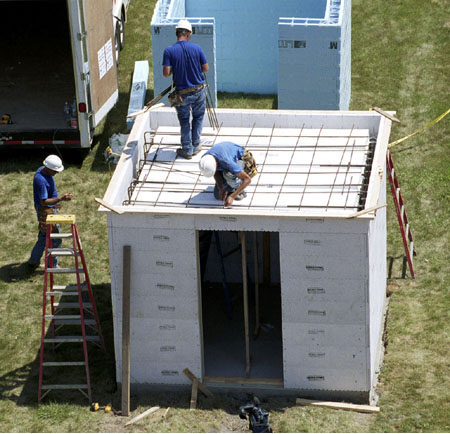
Construction of a safe room

A safe room, also known as a panic room, is a secure enclosure within or adjacent to a building designed to protect occupants from natural disasters or human threats. Common residential uses include protection from tornadoes, hurricanes, and associated debris, while some installations address risks such as abduction or targeted attacks. Costs range from a few thousand to hundreds of thousands of dollars, depending on factors such as the type of threat, level of comfort desired, and whether the room is built during original construction or added later. Standards and guidelines govern their design and construction, and provisions for survival supplies are typically included to ensure self-sufficiency following an emergency.

== Overview ==
A safe room (or panic room) is a hardened space within or adjacent to a building intended to protect occupants from natural hazards and human threats. Interest has increased with perceived growth in such threats. Common residential applications address wind-borne debris during tornadoes and hurricanes; other uses include temporary refuge from targeted criminal attacks. Costs vary with the intended threats, desired comfort, and whether the room is built during initial construction or retrofitted, ranging from a few thousand to hundreds of thousands of dollars. Retrofitting is generally more costly than inclusion during original construction.

For severe weather, design emphasizes resistance to debris impact and storm effects. Violent (F4) tornadoes can produce winds up to 260 mph and propel 8-ft 2×4 lumber at about 100 mph, which can penetrate ordinary walls. Hurricanes generate dangerous debris and storm surge; in hurricane zones, safe rooms are elevated above the expected surge of a Category 5 event. Where river flooding is possible, construction at least 2 ft above the 100-year design flood level is recommended. Threat assessment also considers flood hazards, storm surge, high water table, cost, accessibility, comfort for longer occupancy, and probability of debris impact.

Other motivations include civil-defense-type shelters (e.g., early-1960s bomb shelters) and requirements in Israel, where building codes mandate personal safe rooms. In the United States, underground survival pods and private bomb shelters exist. Safe rooms may also protect documents and personal property. For high security, details of design, construction, and location are restricted; in some cases installers are blindfolded when traveling to the site.

Construction depends on foundation type and whether the room is new or retrofitted. Industry guidance includes the ICC/NSSA Standard for the Design and Construction of Storm Shelters (ICC 500), and the National Storm Shelter Association provides quality-verified products. Typical measures include thicker concrete floors, additional wall reinforcement, and a reinforced concrete ceiling, with control joints separating the enclosure from the rest of the structure. Suitable locations include a garage corner, bathroom, storage closet, laundry room, or closet. Kevlar has been used for retrofits. Because walls and roofs are heavy, floors commonly require additional reinforcement; where a separate foundation is needed, a detached shelter adjacent to the house may be preferable.

Even if refuge is brief, occupants typically store supplies in case services are disrupted. Suggested items include food, water, a radio, flashlight, bedding, toiletries, a small generator, a chainsaw, medical supplies, repair parts, and a firearm. Experience after major tornado outbreaks (e.g., the 2011 Super Outbreak in the United States) indicates that some occupants may need to remain self-sufficient for days.

== Construction techniques ==
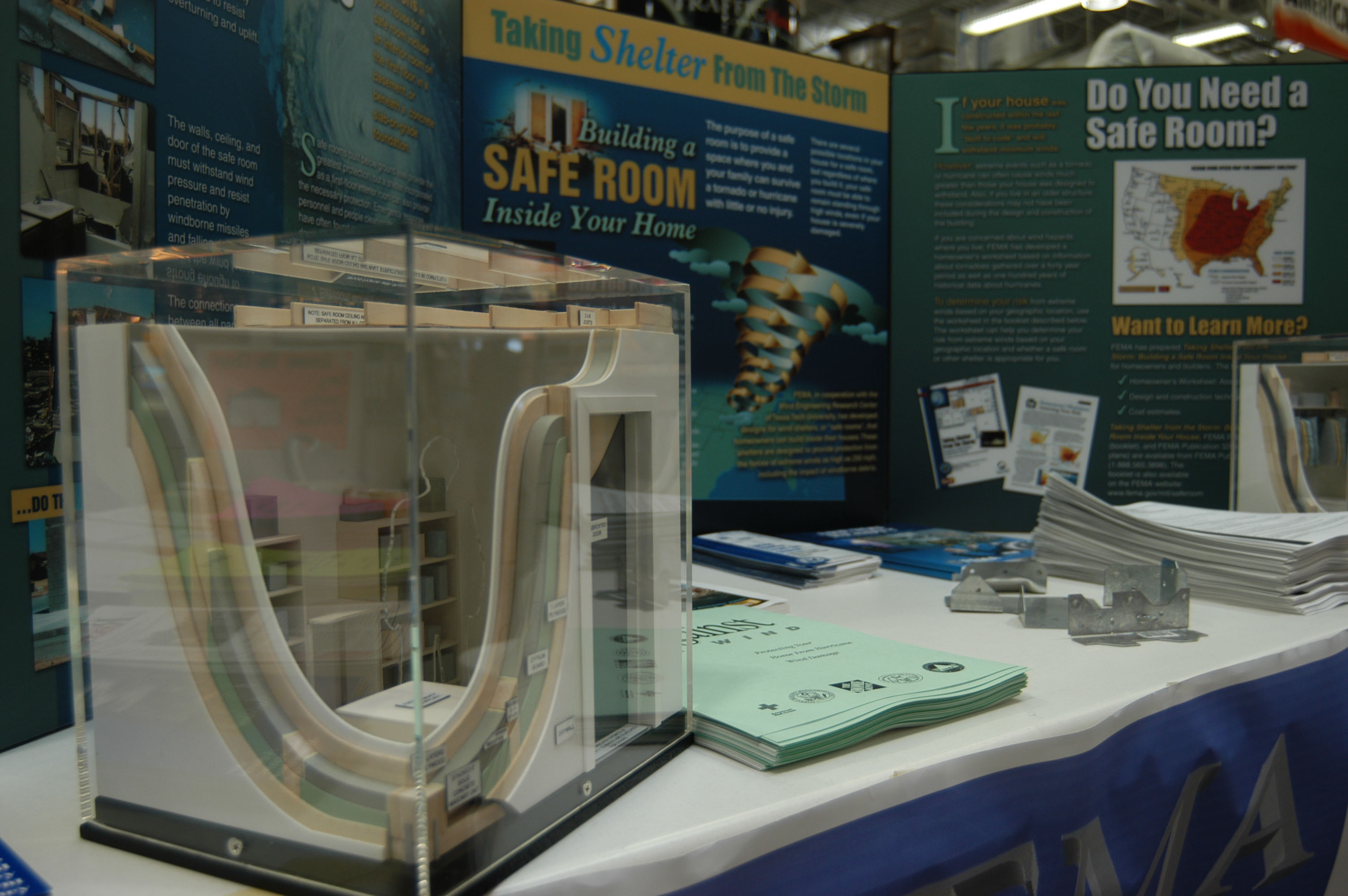
FEMA Mitigation provides information on building safe rooms inside homes for areas of the United States prone to high winds. A mockup of a safe room is shown in the foreground.

The most basic safe room is simply a closet with the hollow-core door replaced with an exterior-grade solid-core door that has a deadbolt and longer hinge screws and strike-plate screws to resist battering. Sometimes, the ceiling is reinforced, or gated, to prevent easy access from the attic or from an overhead crawl space.

More expensive safe rooms have walls and a door reinforced with sheets of steel, Kevlar, or bullet-resistant fiberglass. The hinges and strike plate are often reinforced with long screws. Some safe rooms may also have externally vented ventilation systems and a separate telephone connection. They might also connect to an escape shaft.

Safe rooms in the basement or on a concrete slab can be built with concrete walls, a building technique that is normally not possible on the upper floors of wood-framed structures unless there is significant structural reinforcement to the building.

The U.S. State Department often uses steel grillwork much like a jail to seal off parts of a home used by U.S. Foreign Service members overseas when they are living in cities with a high crime threat. In some cities, the entire upstairs area is grilled off, as well as every window and door to the home. Other homes have steel doors to one or more bedrooms that can be bolted closed to provide time for security forces to arrive.

For strong storms or tornadoes, a storm safe room must be built to withstand high winds and flying debris, even if the rest of the residence becomes severely damaged or destroyed. Specific concerns include:

- The safe room should be adequately anchored to the foundation to resist overturning and uplift.
- The walls, ceiling, and door of the shelter should withstand wind pressure and resist penetration by wind-borne objects or falling debris.
- The connections between all parts of the safe room should be strong enough to resist separation by wind.
- Sections of either interior or exterior residence walls which are used as walls of the safe room, should be separated from the structure of the residence so that damage to the residence will not cause damage to the safe room.

== Features ==
Safe rooms may contain communications equipment, such as a cellular telephone, land-line telephone or an amateur radio transceiver, so that law enforcement authorities can be contacted. There may also be a monitor for external security cameras and an alarm system. In basic safe rooms, a peephole in the door may be used for a similar purpose. Safe rooms are typically stocked with basic emergency and survival items such as a flashlight, blankets, a first-aid kit, water, packaged food, self-defense tools, a gas mask, and a simple portable toilet. High-end safe rooms may have a gun closet, a biodefense air-filtration system that removes biological and nuclear contaminants, and a panic button that locks down the entire house.

Safe rooms can be hidden behind many household features, such as mirrors, wardrobes, bookcases, sliding bookcases, and even fireplaces.

== Citadel on ships ==
Safe rooms on civilian ships, sometimes called "citadels", are increasingly being installed as a countermeasure against piracy. When attacked, the crew can retreat into the safe room and call for help (which in the case of ships of some countries may include the intervention of military forces). Due to the nature of ship construction, the safe room is typically constructed in a concealed location within a void within the ship, to resist efforts by the pirates to find the crew before help arrives. Safe rooms sometimes have facilities to allow the crew to remotely disable the ship's engines and electronic systems, making it impossible for the pirates to sail the ship to a location they control. The safe room is also typically armoured against direct physical attack, to allow the crew to remain safe for a few hours, even if located by the pirates, and to allow rescuing forces full scope for the use of armed force to re-take the ship without risk to the crew.

The effect of the safe room is thus to deny the pirates access to the crew for hostage-taking, to remove the capability to move the ship to a location favourable for the pirates, and to facilitate retaking the ship by armed force without risk to the crew. The retreat of the crew to a safe room could encourage the pirates to leave the ship of their own volition.

Safe rooms have been used as a defensive measure in ships threatened by piracy in Somalia. In 2010, 4,185 seafarers had been attacked and 1,090 taken hostage, but 342 were kept safe in a citadel.

== See also ==
- Merkhav Mugan - safe room (lit. "protected space") in Israel
