= Sofa bed =

Form of sofa that converts into a bed

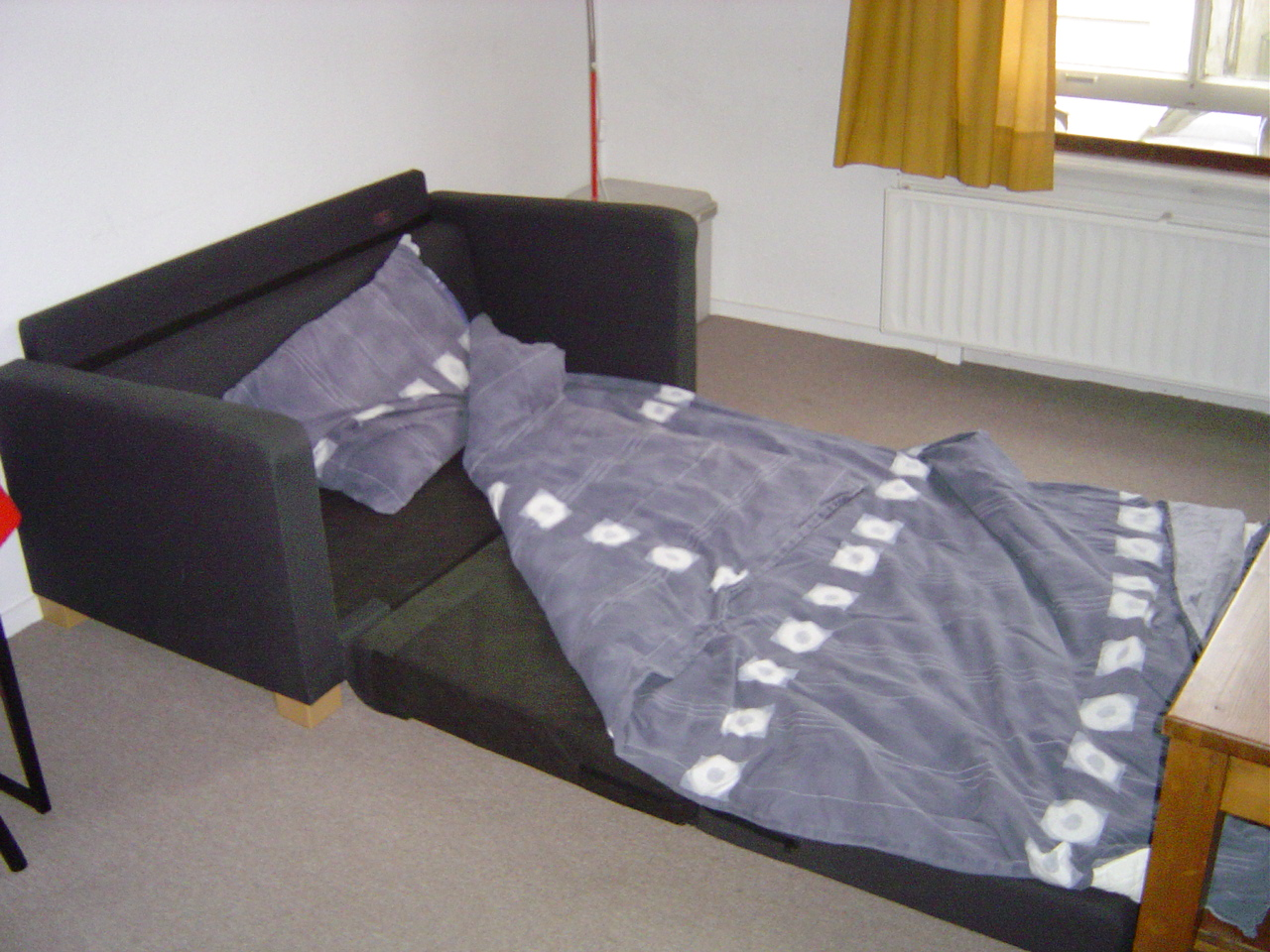
A couch unfolded into a bed

A sofa bed or sofa-bed (in the US often called a sofabed, hide-a-bed, bed-couch, sleeper-sofa, or pullout sofa) is a multifunctional furniture typically consisting of a sofa or couch that, underneath its seating cushions, hides a metal frame and thin mattress that can be unfolded or opened up to make a bed. A western-style futon differs from a sofa bed, although sofa beds using futon mattresses are common.

== History ==
Leonard C. Bailey filed a patent for the first "folding bed" on July 18, 1899. The metal bed frame could be folded, and the bent mattress could be closed for use if needed. Later, it was known as a "hide-a-bed".

Rudolf Coopersmith filed a patent for the Davenport bed in 1905. Between 1905 and 1947, Coopersmith filed over 30 patents for mechanical parts of sofa beds, mattresses, and mattress manufacturing machinery. In 1925, he took out a patent for the sofa bed, the precursor of the modern-day pullout sofa.

William Lawrence Murphy took out a patent for making "In-A-Dor bed", which is known as a "Murphy bed" today. The folded space-saver into a wall closet characterizes it.

In 1931, Bernard Castro made and sold the "Castro convertible" by using $400 from his savings. Castro's design is the evolution of most sofa beds sold nowadays.

After mimicking the Japanese founders, the futon appeared in the United States around 1980. William Brouwer developed the first sofa convertible frame style in the United States.

A "slide away bed" can refer to a sofa bed that slides to the wall to form a sofa, with the mattress hinged to form a seating surface and back support. The bed frame support is a telescoping frame that allows the bed platform to recess below the seating cushion. The primitive version of the Slide Away Bed was invented by Manning Lane, Warren J. Hauck and Roy O. Sweeney of Cincinnati, Ohio. The knock-down sofa bed with hinged mattress patent was filed on September 5, 1978, and issued on May 27, 1980.

== Mattress types ==
Although most sofa beds use a queen short mattress measuring 150 cm × 185 cm (60 in × 72 in), other common sizes include 145 cm × 185 cm (58 in × 72 in), 135 cm × 185 cm (54 in × 72 in), and 130 cm × 185 cm (52 in × 72 in). The average sofa bed mattress thickness is 11 cm (4.5 in). Sofa mattresses can be produced out of many different materials; the majority are made of springs or foam.

=== Spring sofa mattress ===
Spring sofa mattresses usually contain:

- Free length represents the overall length of a spring when no load is applied.
- Solid height is the compression length when the spring has been deflected enough to allow each adjacent coil to touch each other.
- Working length represents the difference between free and solid heights.
- Active coils is the number of coils that are free to deflect under load, i.e., the total number of coils minus the number of closed coils forming the ends, which measures the spring quality.
- Hydrogen embrittlement represents the hydrogen absorbed in electroplating of carbon steels.

=== Foam sofa mattress ===
- Density measures the kilograms (or pounds) of polyurethane foam per cubic meter (or cubic foot). High-density foams can be made very soft, whereas low-density foams can be made very firm.
- Indentation force deflection (IFD) measures the foam's support, representing the Newtons (or pounds of force) required to indent a foam sample by a specified percentage of its original thickness.
- Foam durability, flex fatigue, and compression set are other terms related to foam performance.

=== Pocket-coil mattress ===
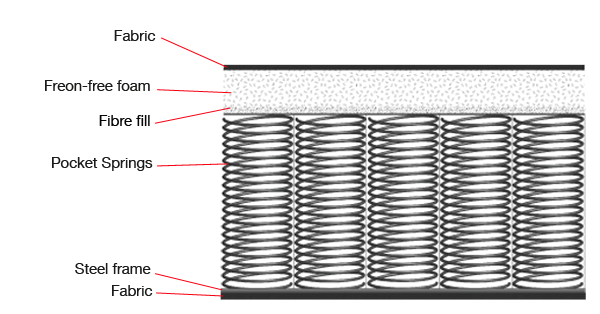
Pocket coil construction

Pocket-coil mattresses are mattresses with coils resting inside the base of the mattress. Each coil is encased in a pocket, allowing the mattress to keep its shape over time.

=== Slide-away bed ===
A slide-away bed is a sofa bed that slides to the wall to form a sofa. The mattress is hinged to create a seating surface and back support. The bed frame support is a telescoping frame that allows the bed platform to recess below the seating cushion.

== Sleeping chair ==
A sleeping chair, armchair bed or chair bed can differ from sleeper sofas or futons in that they are made for a one-person width, which is reflected by them sometimes being referred to as single sofa bed chairs. Some sleeping chairs are multifunctional furniture that can also function as a chaise longue or recliner when upright.

== See also ==
- Bunk bed
- Murphy bed
- Camp bed
