= Murphy bed =

Bed that is hinged at one end to store vertically against the wall

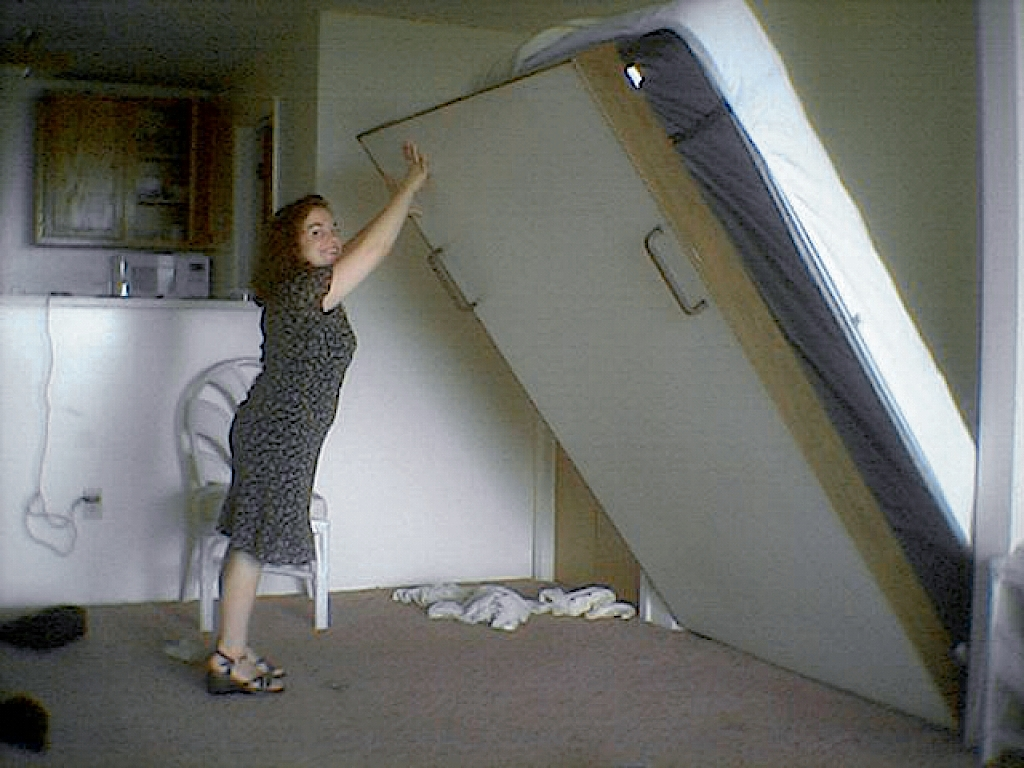
Folding a Murphy bed

A Murphy bed (also known as a pull-down bed, fold-down bed, or wall bed) is a bed that is hinged at one end to store vertically against the wall, or inside a closet or cabinet. Since they often incorporate other purposes, Murphy beds are considered multifunctional furniture.

== History ==
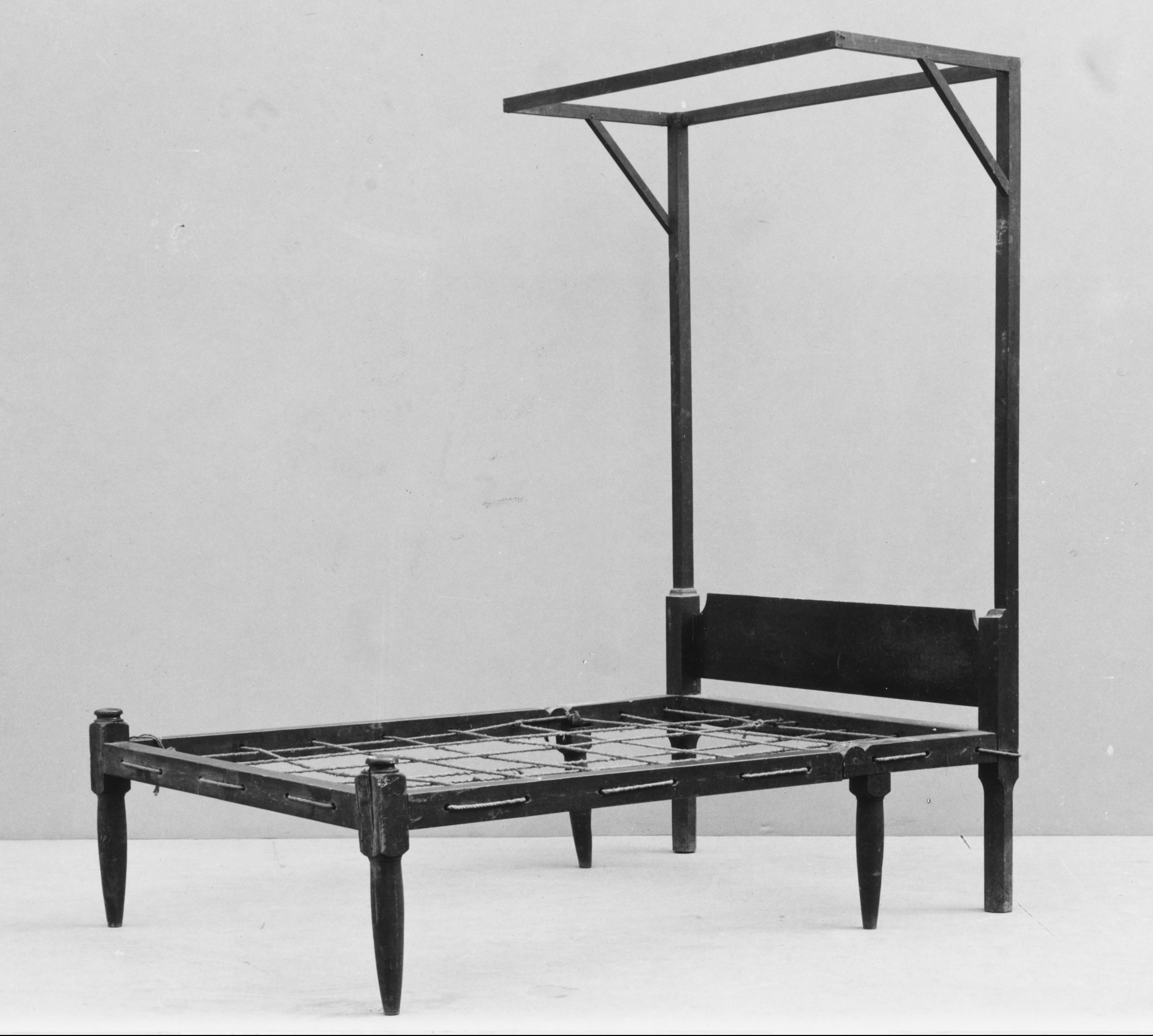
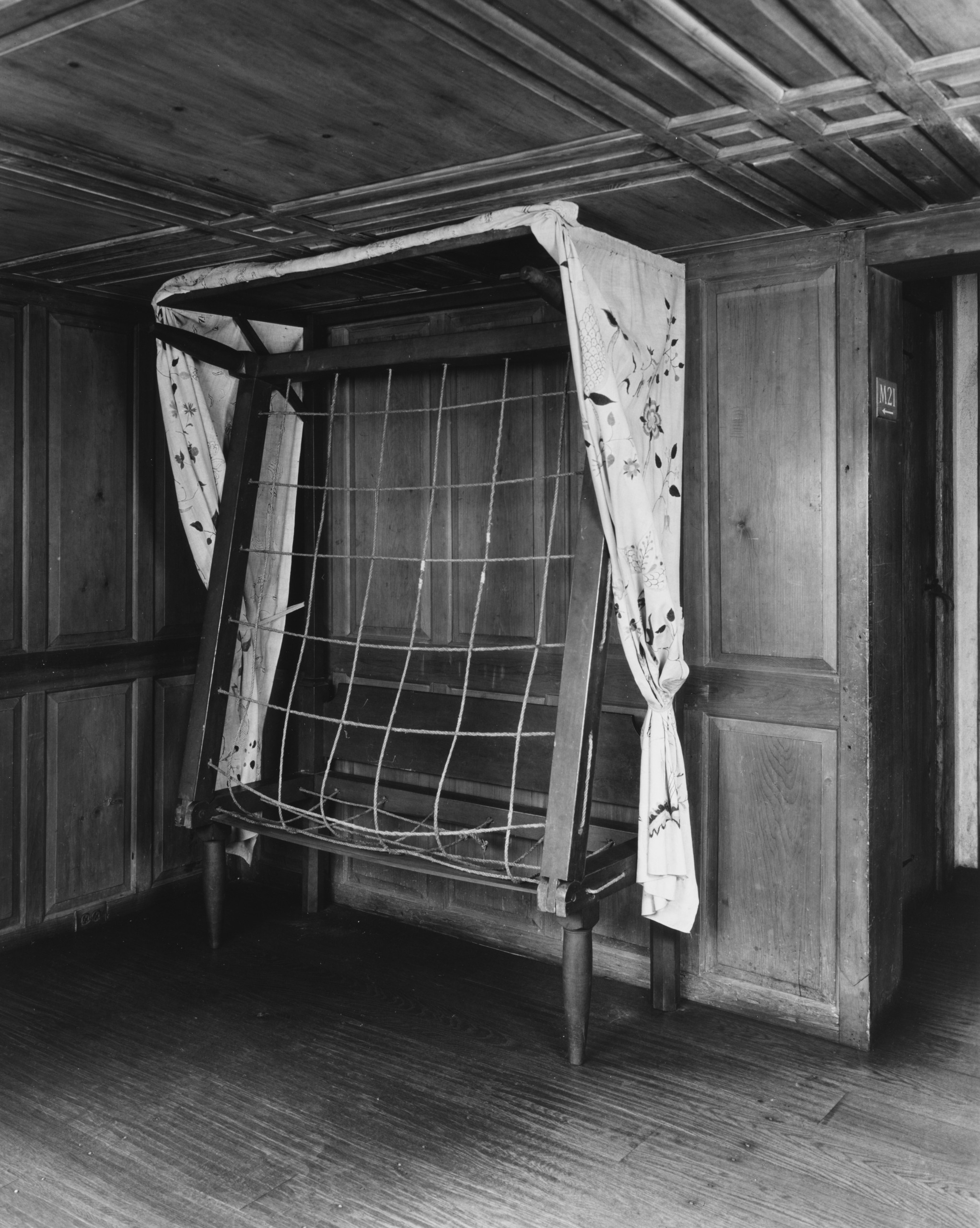
A folding rope bedstead, 1740–1790, United States. In use, the upper frame would suspend a canopy, which would hide the bed entirely when it was folded and make it a lit à demi-ciel when unfolded.

The Murphy bed is named after William Lawrence Murphy (1876–1957), president of the Murphy Bed and Door Company.

=== Pre-Murphy folding beds ===
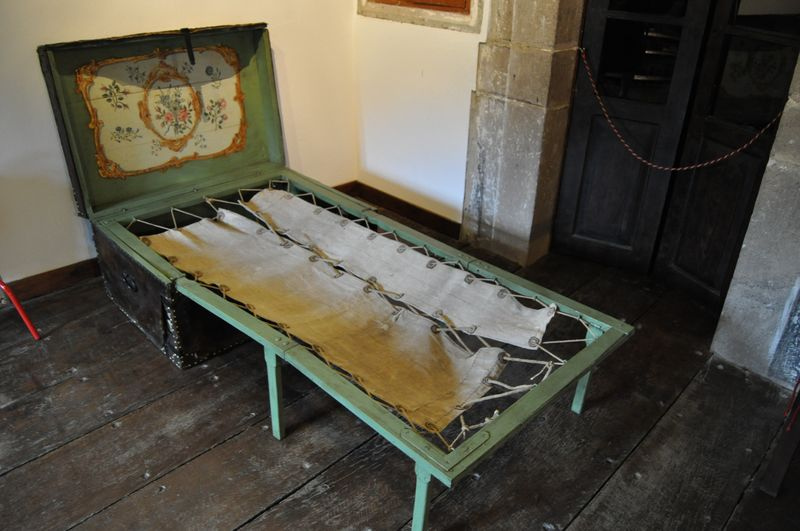
A 1700s chest-hideabed in the Casona de Tudanca, with lashings to retension it

Under the name "bureau bedstead" the fold-up bed appeared in the eighteenth century, but never gained popularity. When closed, the bed looked like a bureau with fake drawers, hence the name. Gloag points to three eighteenth century pieces: one manufactured by Gillows of Lancaster and London in 1788, another one advertised by John Taylor in 1769, and the third one with a description published in the Prices for Cabinet Work in 1797.

A foldup bed was exhibited in the US by Sarah E. Goode in 1884, and foldup beds were offered through the Sears, Roebuck & Co. catalog in 1895, before Murphy's inventions.

=== Murphy ===
Murphy applied for his first patents around 1900. According to legend, he was wooing an opera singer, but living in a one-room apartment in San Francisco, and the moral code of the time frowned upon a woman entering a man's bedroom. Murphy's invention converted his bedroom into a parlor, enabling him to entertain.

Murphy introduced pivot and counterbalanced designs for which he received a series of patents, including one for a "Disappearing Bed" on June 18, 1912, and another for a "Design for a Bed" on June 27, 1916.

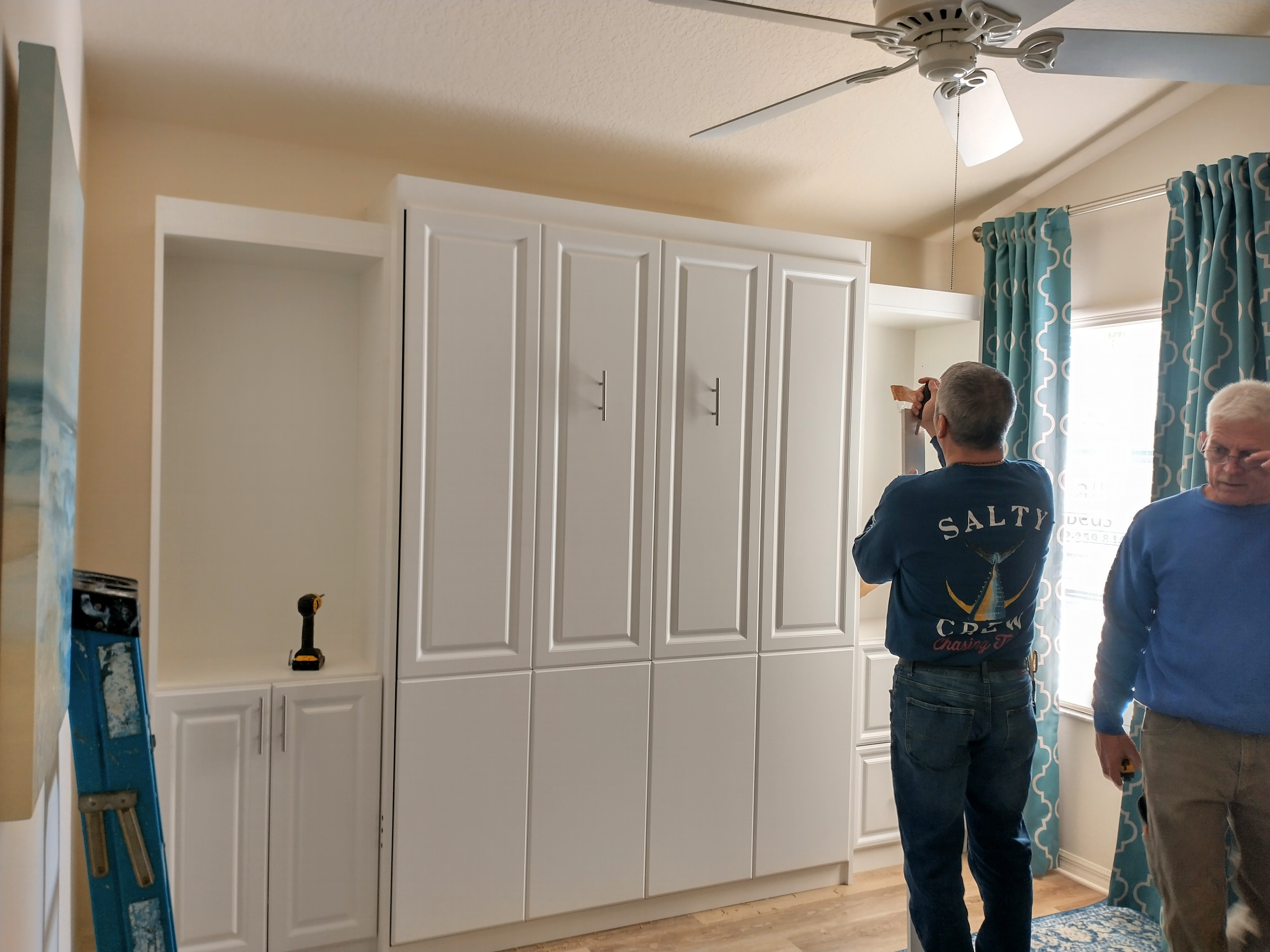
Workmen installing a wall bed

Murphy beds are used for space-saving purposes, much like trundle beds, and are popular where floor space is limited, such as small houses, apartments, hotels, mobile homes and college dormitories. In recent years, Murphy bed units have included options such as lighting, storage cabinets, and office components. They saw a resurgence in popularity in the early 2010s due to the weak economy, with children moving back in with their parents and families choosing to renovate homes rather than purchasing larger ones.

In 1989, the United States Court of Appeals for the Second Circuit ruled that the term "Murphy Bed" had entered common usage so thoroughly that it was no longer eligible for trademark protection.

== Designs and models ==
Few Murphy beds have box springs. Instead, the mattress usually lies on a wood platform or wire mesh and is held in place so as not to sag when in a closed position. The mattress is attached to the bed frame, often with elastic straps to hold the mattress in position when the unit is folded upright. Pistons-lifts or torsion springs make modern Murphy beds easy to lower and raise.

Instructions for operating a Murphy bed

Since the first model several other variations and designs have been created, including: sideways-mounted Murphy beds, Murphy bunk beds, and solutions that include other functions. Murphy beds exist with tables or desks that fold down when the bed is folded up, and there are also models with sofas and shelving solutions.

== Risks ==
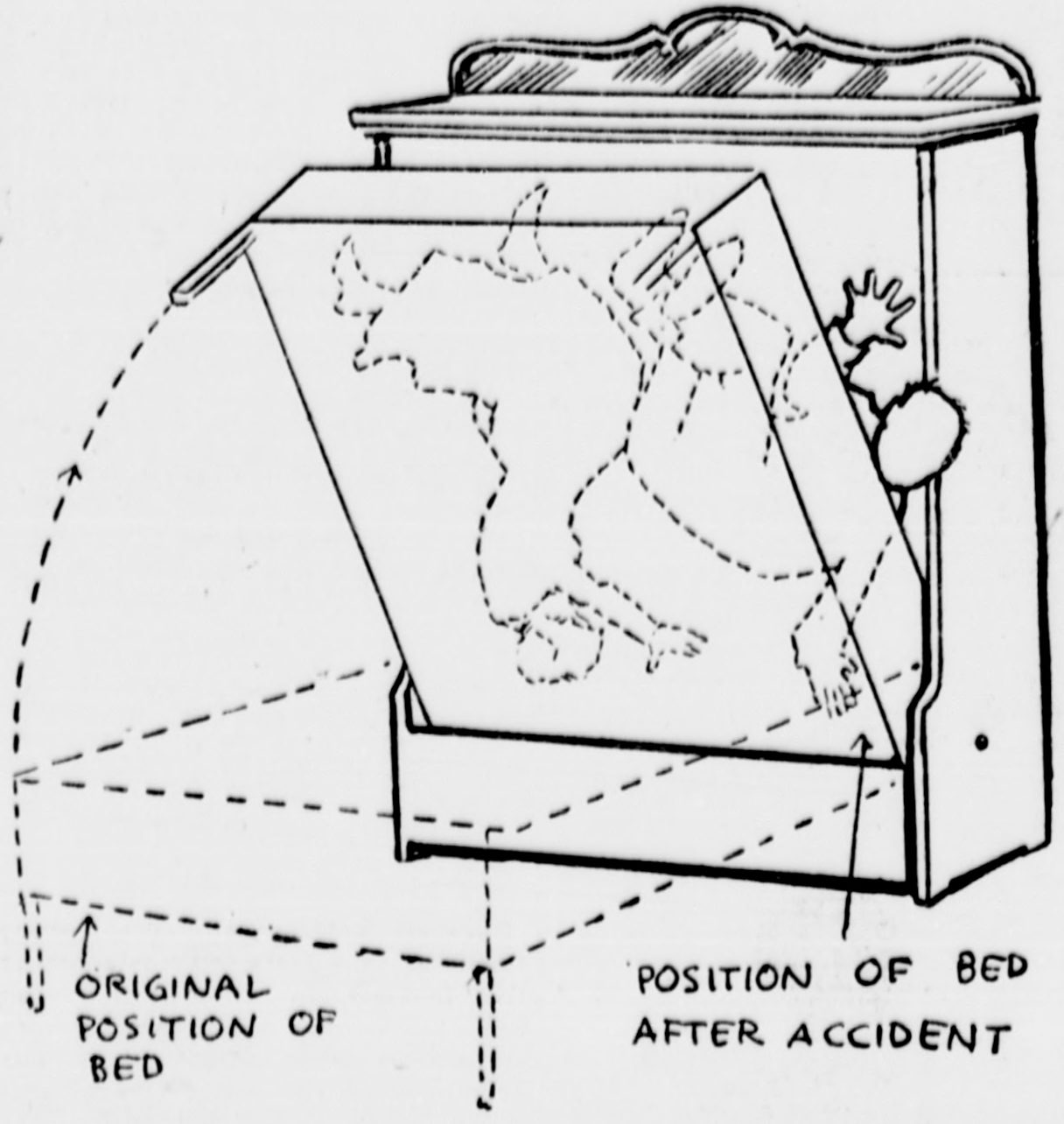
Diagram showing how bed closed on people

If not secured or used properly, a Murphy bed could collapse on the operator. A 1945 court case in Illinois found that a tenant assumed the risk of injury from a wall bed installed in a rented inn room. In 1982, a drunk man suffocated inside a closed Murphy bed, and two women were entrapped and suffocated by an improperly installed wall bed in 2005. A 2014 lawsuit alleged that a defective Murphy bed led to the death of a Staten Island man. In April 2022, Bestar Wall Beds of Quebec, Canada, recalled 129,000 beds in the United States and 53,000 beds in Canada after a 79-year-old woman was killed and 60 others injured by falling beds. Later that year, Cyme Tech, also of Quebec, Canada, recalled 8,200 beds after 146 reports of falling beds resulting in 62 injuries.

== In popular culture ==
Murphy beds were a common setup for comic scenes in early cinema, including in silent films. The earliest known film to feature a Murphy bed is the lost 1900 Biograph Company film A Bulletproof Bed, which was remade in 1903 by Edison Pictures as the extant film Subub Surprises the Burglar. It was a recurrent slapstick element in many Keystone Studios productions of the 1910s, including Cursed by His Beauty (1914), Fatty's Reckless Fling (1915), He Wouldn't Stay Down (1915), and Bath Tub Perils (1916). Charlie Chaplin's 1916 One AM also features an exaggerated encounter with a Murphy bed.

Murphy beds were a routine enough feature of comic film to invite commentary from retailers. One store based in Vancouver, British Columbia remarked in an advertisement, "Gone are the days of Laurel and Hardy where the beds were portrayed as a fold away trap for your worst enemies."

In comics, the Murphy bed is depicted in the Tintin book Red Rackham's Treasure as being an invention of Professor Calculus.

In British television comedy The Goodies, the three main characters sleep on Murphy beds.

In American teen sitcom The Suite Life of Zack & Cody, character Maddie Fitzpatrick has a murphy bed in her apartment, which character London Tipton gets stuck in during episode "Poor Little Rich Girl".

In the life simulation game The Sims 4, Murphy beds were introduced in the Tiny Living Stuff Pack. They function as space-saving furniture for small homes and apartments, though they are also known among players for occasionally malfunctioning and injuring Sims when folded down.

== See also ==
- Bed base
- Murphy door
- Sofa bed
- Western-style futons

== Sources ==
- Gloag, John (1952). A Short Dictionary Of Furniture. Read Books Ltd. ISBN 978-1-4474-9772-1. OCLC 1099027952.
