= Barcalo =

Barcalo may refer to:

- Edward J. Barcalo (1870-1963) U.S. inventor, entrepreneur, businessman, founder of Barcalo
- Barcalounger Company, formerly Barcalo
