= Canapé (furniture) =

Luxurious couch

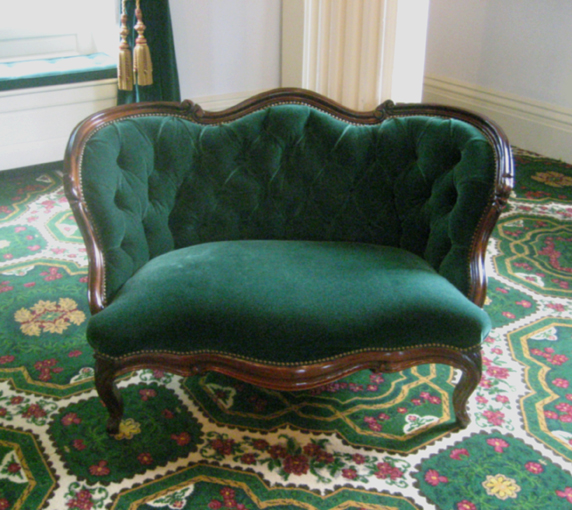
This Rococo Revival canapé delivered to the Vermont State House in 1859 would have been called a settee.

A canapé is a piece of furniture similar to a couch. The word is typically meant to describe an elegant couch made out of elaborately carved wood with wooden legs, an upholstered back, armrests, and a single long seat (instead of separate cushions) that typically seats three, that emerged from France in the 18th century.

A style created during the Louis XV and Louis XVI periods, similar yet different from designs used by Thomas Chippendale, it later became popular in the United States during the 19th century.

Its shape is distinct from other sofas of the period, including the divan and chaise longue, but does include several forms.

Frequently, matching chairs were made to accompany it. Precious hardwoods such as walnut, cherry, and mahogany were often used in its construction.

Currently, the term is used in world furniture design and retail as a variation on sofa, except where antiques or reproductions of 18th-century designs are concerned.
