= Knee Defender =

Part of airplane seat tray table

The Knee Defender is a device that airplane passengers can place on the struts that support their drop-down airplane seat tray table to limit the extent to which the seat directly in front of them can be reclined. The device was invented by Ira Goldman, and it was first sold to the public in 2003. While the legality of using these devices on commercial flights is unclear, some carriers such as Delta, United, Qantas, Virgin, Jetstar, and some other major airlines have banned the use of this or similar devices on their flights. The manufacturer of the device advises purchasers of the device to: "Be courteous. Do not hog space. Listen to the flight crew."

== Controversy ==
In August 2014, on a United Airlines flight in North America from Newark to Denver, an argument developed between a passenger using a Knee Defender and the passenger seated in front of him who wanted to recline. Ultimately the pilot diverted the flight to Chicago and both of those passengers were deplaned.
