= Naked Child Laughing (painting) =

1963 painting by Lucian Freud

- Artist: Lucian Freud
- Year: 1963
- Medium: Oil on canvas
- Dimensions: 28 cm × 34 cm (11 in × 13 in)
- Location: Private collection

Naked Child Laughing is an oil on canvas painting by Lucian Freud of a nude girl laughing, done in 1963. It is held in a private collection.

== Description ==
The painting was actually the first nude made by Freud. It was also one of the several that he did during his career of his own children, in different ages. This painting shows his eldest daughter, Annie, then aged 14 years old, as a naked teenage girl, sitting on a settee and laughing.
