= Edwin Shoemaker =

American businessman (1907–1988)

- Born: Edwin John Shoemaker; June 2, 1907; Monroe, Michigan, U.S
- Died: March 15, 1998 (aged 90); Sun City, Arizona, U.S
- Spouse: Ruth Buck (m. 1935)
- Children: 3

Edwin John Shoemaker (June 2, 1907 – March 15, 1998) was an American businessman who co-founded the American furniture company La-Z-Boy with Edward Knabusch in 1927. He is deemed as the inventor of recliners.

== Early life ==
Edwin John Shoemaker was born on June 2, 1907 in Monroe, Michigan. He grew up in a family who farmed. His cousin, Ed Shoemaker, was a marketer and engineer.

== Career ==
In 1927, Shoemaker and Knabusch formed Floral City Furniture, where Knabusch handled the marketing while Shoemaker handled the furniture engineering. During World War II, the two manufactured seats and crash pads for tanks. 85 chairs were produced per day from a factory. In 1928, Shoemaker used a sheet of plywood and a yard stick to create the early designs of a recliner. In 1953, he founded the La-Z-Boy Chair Foundation alongside Knabusch and Herman F. Gertz.

== Personal life ==
Shoemaker lived in a retirement community in Arizona, and was married to Ruth Marion Buck. The couple later had 3 children. Shoemaker died on March 15, 1998 in a recliner after going out with some friends in Sun City, Arizona. He was 90.

== See also ==
- Charles Knabusch
