= England Furniture =

American manufacturer of upholstered furniture

England Furniture Incorporated
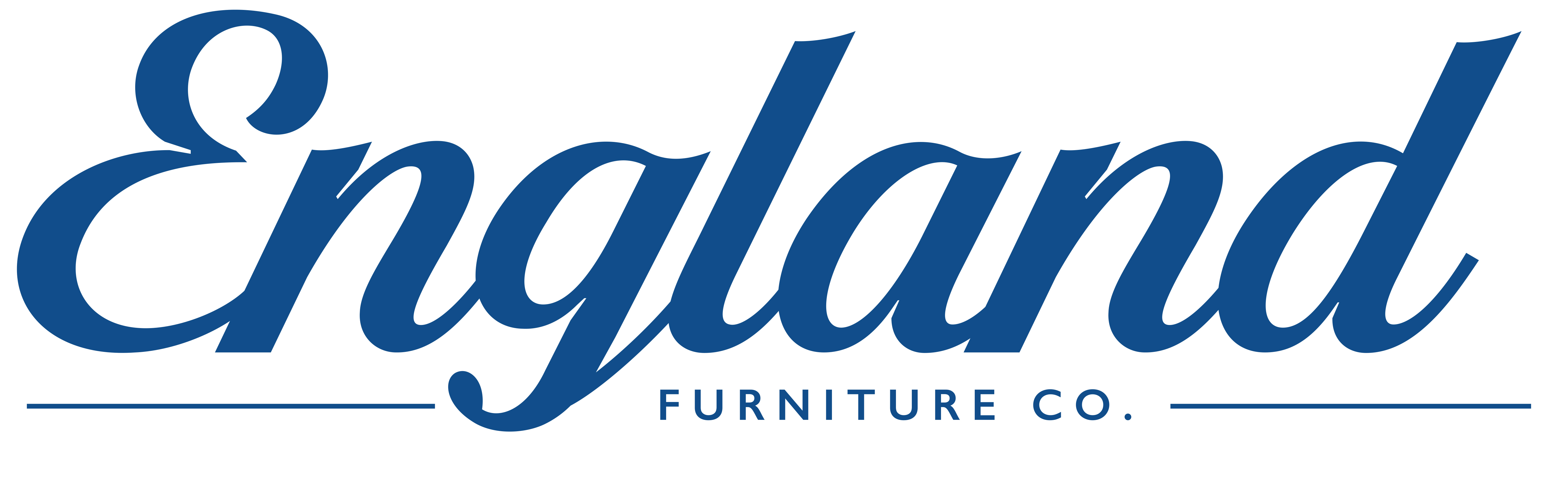
- Type: Subsidiary
- Industry: Furniture
- Founded: 1964; 62 years ago
- Headquarters: New Tazewell, Tennessee, U.S.,
- Products: Upholstered furniture and casegoods
- Parent: La-Z-Boy
- Website: www.englandfurniture.com

England Furniture Incorporated is an American manufacturer of upholstered furniture. They are based in New Tazewell, Tennessee, and were founded in 1964 by Charles England and sons Eugene and Dwight “whose goal was to provide an employment alternative for the people in their region of Appalachia.” England Furniture is well known in the industry for pioneering a method of rapid delivery of custom furniture through its proprietary transportation system. In addition to manufacturing, England Furniture sells its furniture through furniture stores (some with galleries called Custom Comfort Centers) across America and Canada. In the same year, England Furniture was acquired by La-Z-Boy.

== History ==
England Furniture Incorporated was founded in 1964 by Dwight England, in partnership with his Father and Brother, under the name “England UPH MFG Co., Inc.” By 1984, England Furniture was working around the clock. The company was the first to offer 2-week delivery for a full truck-load of furniture where most other companies could only offer delivery in 6–12 weeks. In 1987 Rodney England took over from his father as President of England Furniture and retired in 2007. Under Rodney England's leadership, in 1992, England Furniture was awarded the East Tennessee “Entrepreneurial Company of the Year.”

By 1994, England Furniture had sales of $106 million. In 1995, England was acquired by La-Z-Boy to operate as an independent division. England Furniture now employs over 1,000 people. England Furniture often shares images of the craftsmen from within the factory on their Facebook page.

In 2004, England Furniture opened “Customer Furniture Direct” stores to guarantee order fulfillment of any custom frame or fabric furniture item in less than 21 days.

In May of 2017, England Furniture revealed a new logo, slogan and website as part of their re-branding strategy. England Furniture teamed up with a Florida based advertising agency, Tropic Survival, to help revamp their look. England Furniture's new slogan is "Custom for you, fast by us".

In 2018, England Furniture expanded their plant in Tennessee and created 202 jobs after investing $31 million in Claiborne County. Later that year, England Furniture announced an expansion to Virginia where they planned to take over the 32,000 square-foot Lee County Industrial Building for manufacturing purposes.

== Suppliers ==
England furniture uses many vendors for their fabrics. These vendors include Richloom Fabrics, David Rothschild Co., Culp Fabrics, Regal Fabrics, and Chambers Fabrics. The fabric used in England Furniture products are tested by machines for durability, stain resistance, and seam separation.

=== Materials ===
Other vendors for England Furniture include Stein Fibers, for Polyester Fiber, Leggett & Platt, for metal components, and HSM, for specialty foam. England Furniture incorporates Coil-Enhanced Foam Cushion which features 9 spring coils embedded in the core of a foam cushion. The coils enhance the durability and longevity of the cushion.

=== Packaging & Shipping ===
England Furniture’s ships their furniture using the Sealed Air Corporation, and Hayter Die Cutting for packaging the pieces. Hayter Die Cutting uses the heaviest caliper cardboard in the industry and Sealed Air Corporation keeps pieces in place during transportation.
