= Davenport (sofa) =

Type of sofa

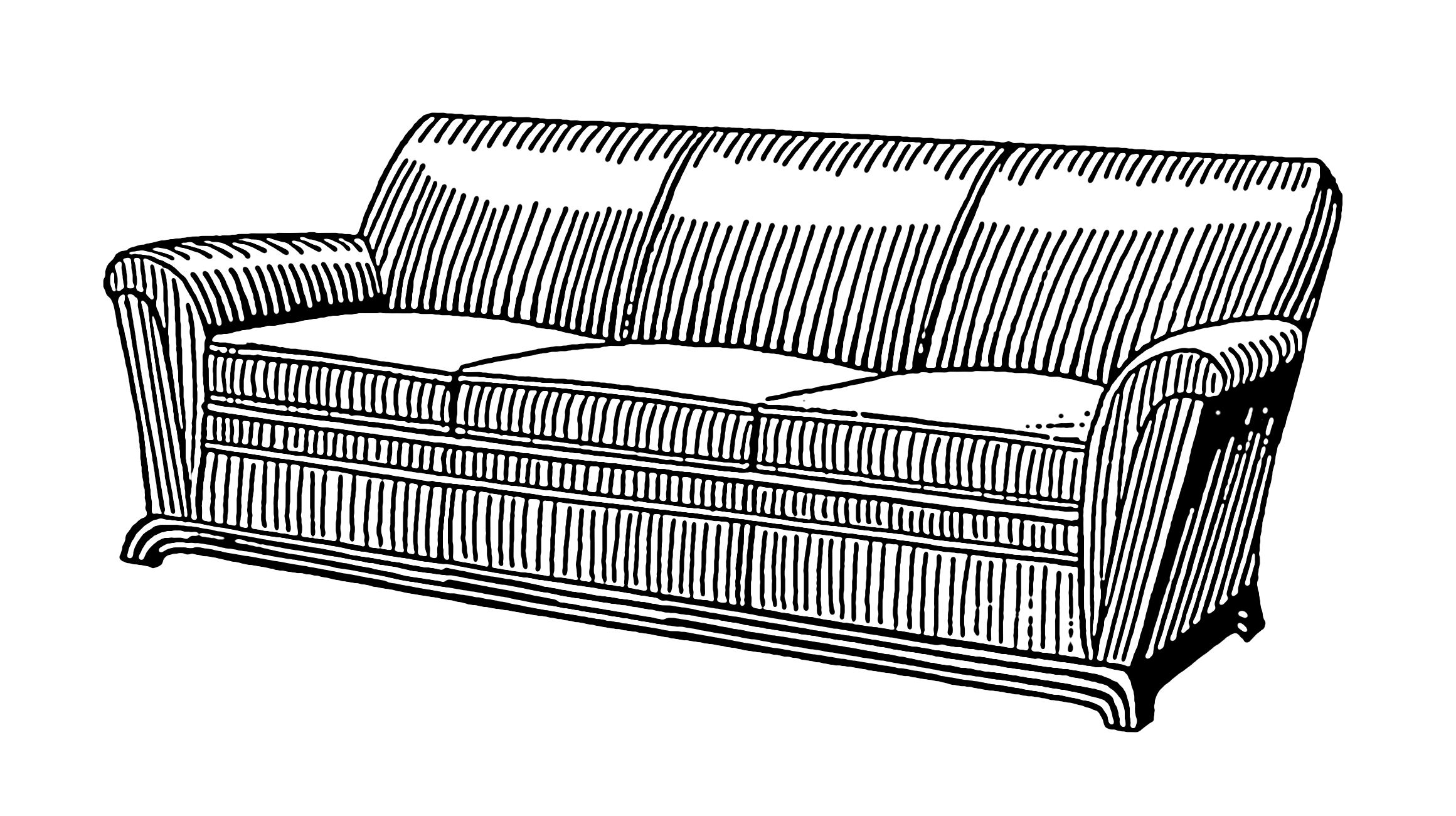
Line art drawing of a davenport

Davenport was the name of a series of sofas made by the Massachusetts furniture manufacturer A. H. Davenport and Company, now defunct. Due to the popularity of the furniture at the time, the name davenport became a genericized trademark in parts of the United States.

== Variations ==
The term is used as a synonym for "sofa" or "couch" in some Great Lakes regions of the United States, especially the Upper Midwest and Buffalo, NY–Erie, PA areas. It was used in the Adirondack Region and the Tug Hill Plateau amongst those born there before World War II. The so-called davenports of the northern New York region are often sofa versions of the locally manufactured convertible Adirondack chair.

The word has come to mean a more formal sofa among the younger generations. In the Tug Hill and Adirondack regions in New York, a davenport may refer primarily to a couch which, like a modern futon lounge, converts on pivoting hinges from a sofa to a bed.

In other areas of North America, the word davenport is used for a futon-style sofa with storage under the seat area.

== Etymology ==
A "large upholstered couch," 1897, apparently named for the manufacturer. Earlier (1853), it was "a kind of small ornamental writing table." The proper name is attested from the 12th century, from a place in Cheshire (Old English Devennport).

A similar word, Daveno, also refers to a sofa or couch. The term was more widely used in the 1950s and 1960s, particularly in the Pacific Northwest.

== See also ==
- Davenport desk
- Divan (furniture)
- Sofa bed
