= Reclining =

Reclining may refer to being in a:

- Reclining chair or recliner, being in an armchair or sofa that adjusts so that the back rest lowers and a footrest rises to allow a person to recline in a comfortable position
- Reclining position or supine, the anatomical term to describe the body being on its back, face up
