= Klippan =

Klippan may refer to:

- Klippan, Scania, a town within the Klippan Municipality in Skåne County, Sweden,
- Klippan Municipality, a municipality in Skåne County, Sweden
- Klippan (Gothenburg), a district of Gothenburg, Sweden
- Klippan (sofa), a popular sofa manufactured and sold by IKEA
