= Window seat (furniture) =

Item of furniture

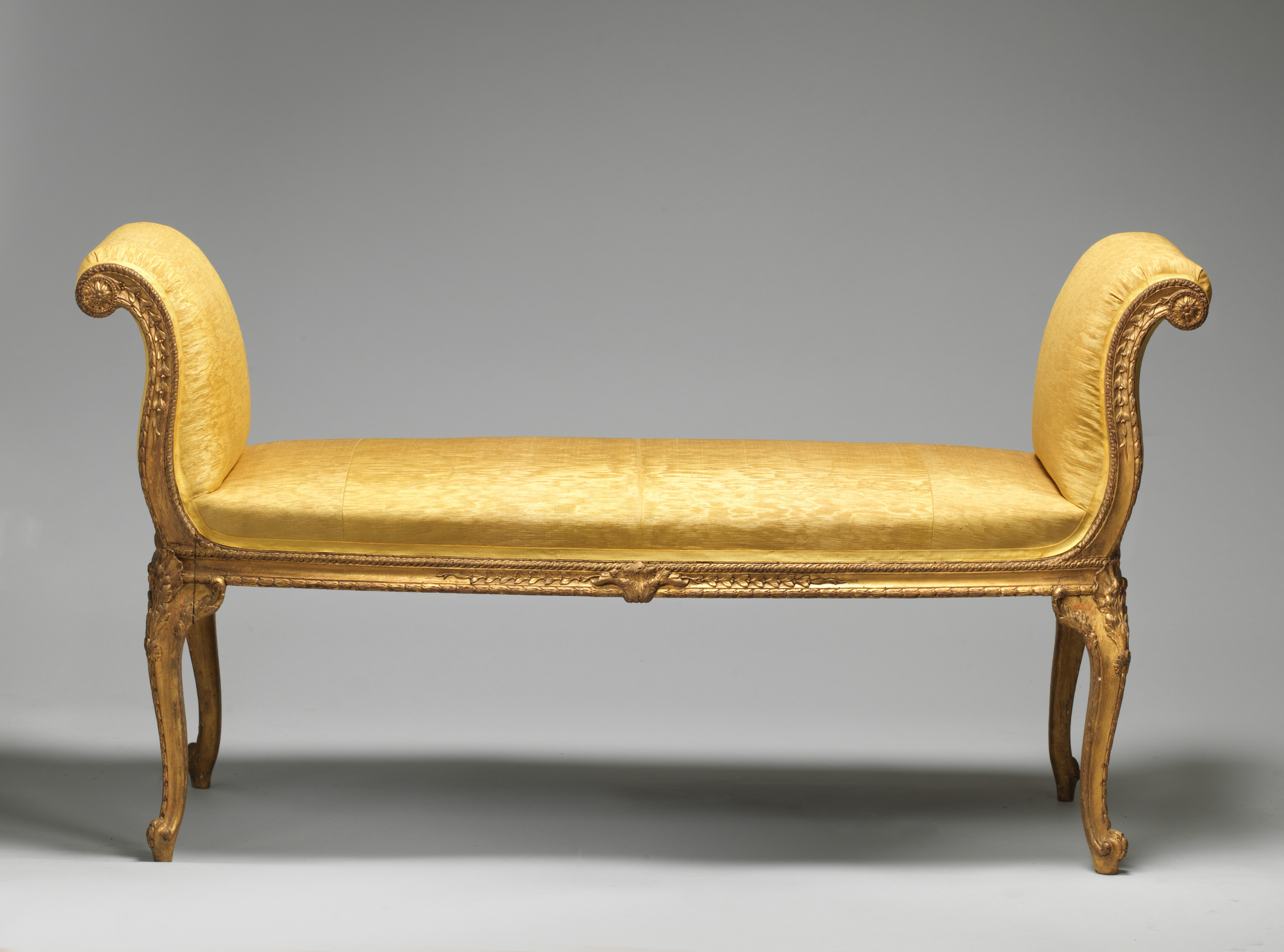
A window seat

A window seat is a miniature sofa without a back, intended to fill the recess of a window. In the latter part of the 18th century, when tall narrow sash windows were almost universal, the window seat was in high favor, keeping with the formalism of Georgian interiors. It differed much in decorative detail but little in form.

It stood as high from the floor as a chair. The two ends were identical, with a roll-over curve, more or less pronounced. The seats and ends were usually upholstered in rich fabrics. The legs followed the fashion in chairs and were square, tapered, or, somewhat later, round and reeded. Hepplewhite and the brothers Adam designed many graceful window seats, but all the cabinet-makers of the period produced them.
