= Davenport desk =

Small desk

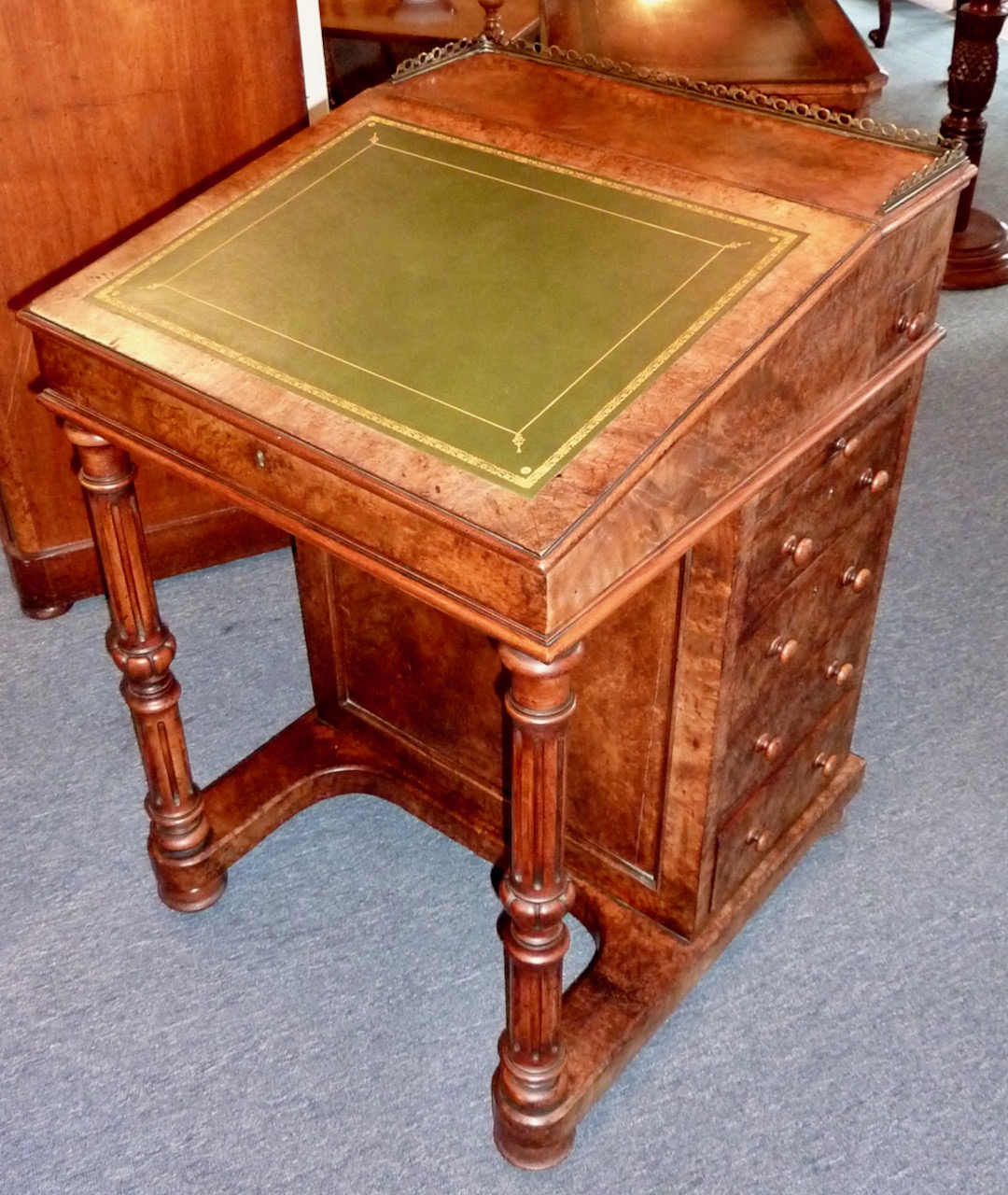
Burr walnut Davenport desk.

A Davenport desk, is a small desk originating in England with an inclined lifting desktop attached with hinges to the back of the body. Lifting the desktop opens a large compartment with storage space for paper and other writing implements and smaller spaces in the form of small drawers and pigeonholes. The Davenport has drawers on one of its sides, which are sometimes concealed by a panel. This stack of side drawers holds up the back of the desk and most of its weight.

== Overview ==
The front of the desk stands on thick legs or pillars which are often highly carved, somewhat exaggerated, thick cabriole legs, but these are not essential. Davenport desks of the 19th century had a variety of different leg designs.

The desk shape is distinctive; its top part resembles an antique school desk while the bottom is like one of the two drawer-pedestals of a pedestal desk turned sideways. The addition of the two legs in front completes the odd effect.

This desk owes its name to a Captain Davenport who was the first to commission the design, from Gillows of Lancaster, near the end of the 18th century..

This desk form was popular during the 19th century. There have been numerous reproductions during the 20th century, and amateur cabinetmakers sometimes consider a Davenport to be an interesting project.

The Davenport desk should not be confused with the Davenport sofa, which is usually a modern combination sofa and bed or an antique form of upholstered sofa based on a design conceived at the beginning of the 20th century by a Boston, Massachusetts, company called A. H. Davenport and Company.

== See also ==
- List of desk forms and types

== General and cited references ==
- Aronson, Joseph (1965). The Encyclopedia of Furniture (registration required). 3rd ed. New York: Crown Publishers.
- Gloag, John (1991). A Complete Dictionary of Furniture (registration required). Woodstock, NY: Overlook Press.
