= Recliner =

Type of armchair or sofa

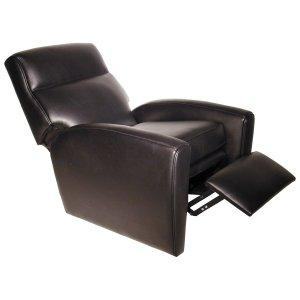
- Designer: Edward Knabusch; Edwin Shoemaker
- Date: 1850; 1900's (Lazboy resells)
- Materials: Leather
- Style / tradition: Sofa

A recliner, also known as a reclining chair, lounger and an armchair, is an armchair or sofa that reclines when the occupant lowers the chair's back and raises its front. It has a backrest that can be tilted back, and often a footrest that may be extended by means of a lever on the side of the chair, or may extend automatically when the back is reclined.

Modern recliners often feature an adjustable headrest, lumbar support and an independent footstool that adjusts with the weight and angle of the user's legs to maximize comfort. Additional features include heat, massage and vibration. Some models are wheelchair accessible.

Recliners can also accommodate a near supine position for sleeping (making them multifunctional furniture), and are common in airplanes and trains, as well as in homes.

Reclining sofas are a form of the recliner. Buttons can be pushed and a system will extend the leg rests outward, and other buttons can cause the headrest to extend into the upward direction for the user’s comfort.

== Etymology ==
The word "recline" was first used in the 1660s, derived ultimately from the Latin word reclinare reclinare. This Latin term itself combines the prefix re- re-, meaning "back," with clinare, meaning clinare "to bend." Beginning in 1880, the word "recliner" was used to describe a type of chair.

== History ==
Around 1850, the French introduced a reclining camp bed that could serve as a chair, a bed and a chaise longue. It was portable and featured padded arm rests and a steel frame. In the late 1800s, many designs were found for motion chairs that were made of wood with a padded seat and back. Designs from France and America included a document or book holder. The first reclining chair was reportedly owned by Napoleon III.

Edward Knabusch and Edwin Shoemaker, two American cousins, are credited with gaining a patent on a wooden recliner. The design was the same wooden bench recliner found in other designs. Issued in 1928, the patent led to the founding of La-Z-Boy. In 1930, Knabusch and Shoemaker patented an upholstered model with a mechanical movement.

== Reception ==
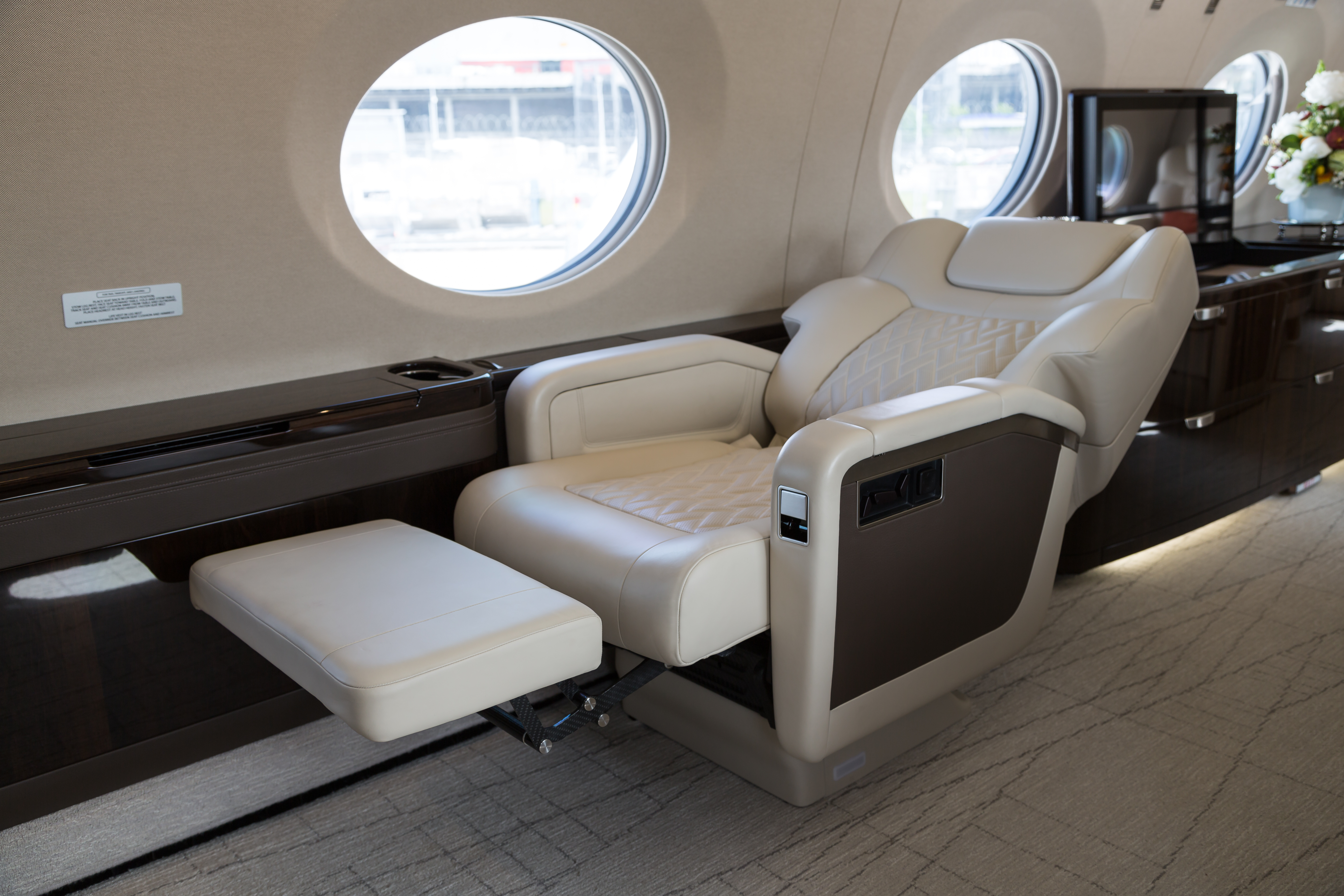
Recliner aboard a business jet

The recliner is used in multiple countries, and in multiple places as well. In 1959, Daniel F. Caldemeyer patented a recliner as owner of National Furniture Mfg. Co based in Evansville, Indiana. The design was based on the science of kinetics that he used while serving in the US Air Force. His design was used by NASA for the seats in Projects Mercury, Gemini and Apollo. His chairs were used in the ready room for these missions and can be seen in the movie Apollo 13.

The Secret Service purchased 50 of the recliners for President Lyndon B. Johnson as a Christmas gift. A Life magazine photo of President Johnson, post gall bladder surgery, has the President lifting his shirt and showing his scar while sitting in one of these chairs. The Presidential Seal was embossed on these chairs with one currently in the Smithsonian Institution and another at the Lyndon Baines Johnson Library and Museum. With over 300 patents, Caldemeyer added the foot lift rest, heated seating and massage features to this chair and had the patent for the first entertainment center.

== See also ==
- Ergonomy
- Massage chair
- Sunlounger
