= Barcalounger =

Type of recliner and its US manufacturer

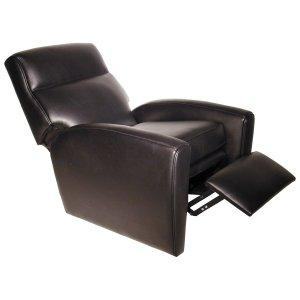
A recliner similar to a Barcalounger

A Barcalounger is a type of recliner that originated from Buffalo, New York, and is named after the company that manufactured it. Like other recliners, Barcaloungers have moving parts to change things such as the inclination of the back. Since the 2010 bankruptcy and 2011 re-emergence, manufacturing - like much of today's furniture is manufactured overseas and quality control is overseen by Barcalounger's US office.

== Chair ==
The Barcalounger chair was introduced by the Barcalo Manufacturing Company of Buffalo, New York, which eventually became the Barcalounger Company. The chairs are currently produced in China.

== Company ==
The Barcalounger Company, once named the Barcalo Manufacturing Company, was founded by Edward J. Barcalo in 1896. It is the oldest manufacturer of reclining chairs in the U.S.

After the company filed for bankruptcy in 2010, it shuttered its facilities in Rocky Mount, North Carolina, and Martinsville, Virginia, then restarted manufacturing at the plant in Morristown, Tennessee, in 2011, for the manufacture of the Barcalounger chair. It is owned by the private equity firm Hancock Park Associates.

Barcalo Manufacturing also made beds in Welland, Ontario, under the Quality Beds name, in the first decade of the 20th century.

=== Development of the "coffee break" ===
Barcalo, the country's oldest manufacturer of reclining chairs, is reputed to be the first American company to allow its employees coffee breaks, in 1902.

== In popular culture ==
In Kurt Vonnegut's God Bless You, Mr. Rosewater (1965), Barcaloungers make an appearance in a reference to Kilgore Trout's novel 2 B R 0 2 B, where they provide luxury seating for wannabe suicides, with government encouragement; "2 B R 0 2 B" is actually a 1962 Vonnegut short story in which Barcaloungers do not figure. In the same author's Slaughterhouse-Five (1969), Billy Pilgrim is strapped to a yellow Barcalounger in the aliens' flying saucer as he is abducted and taken to their planet.

In John Updike's Rabbit Is Rich (1981), a Barcalounger originally belonging to Grandpa Fred Stringer looms large in the tensions between Harry "Rabbit" Angstrom and his son Nelson.

In the American remake of Shameless, Mickey sells two Barcalounger recliners after stealing a couple of household items and going on to auction them in the first episode of season 5.

Joey and Chandler from the hit NBC sitcom Friends owned a set of Barcalounger recliners, which were often used as a plot device within the show.

It is the chair in which Paul's father always sits in Philip Roth's Letting Go.

In The Sopranos episode "46 Long" (1999), Tony Soprano's mother tries to give him her Barcalounger after he refuses to take her ormolu lamp. Tony becomes mad when he learns that she gave his cousin Cartier jewelry, while she offered him "a vibrating chair."

== See also ==
- La-Z-Boy
