= Slipcover =

Protective cover for upholstered furniture

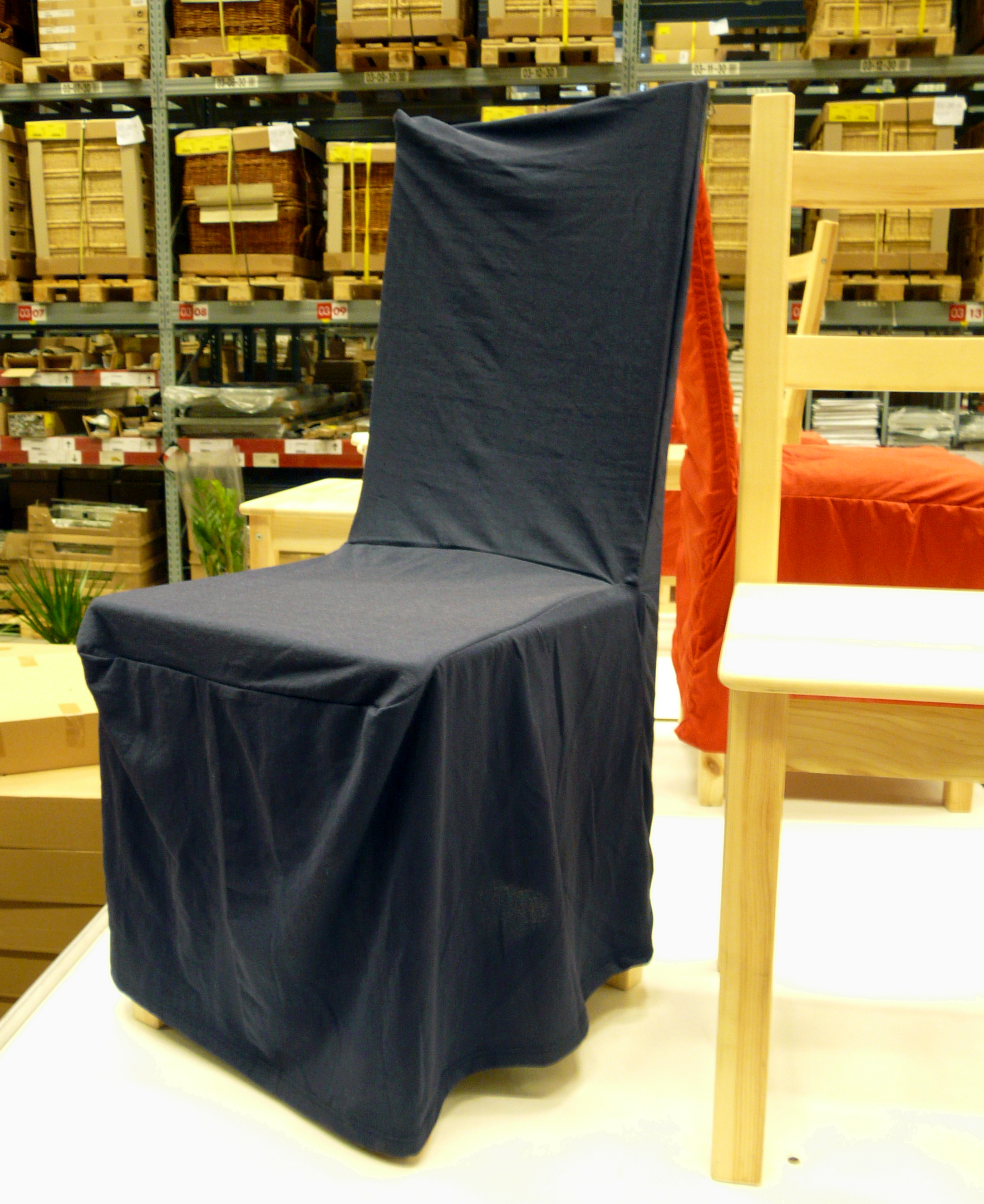
A chair fitted with a black slipcover

A slipcover (also called loose cover) is a fitted protective cover that may be slipped off and onto a piece of upholstered furniture. Slipcovers are usually made of cloth. Slipcovers slip on and off; they come fresh and may be removed for seasonal change, cleaning, moving, or storage.

Slipcovers are sometimes defined as "clothing for furniture." Indeed, they are tailored just as clothing and fitted loosely or snugly to the owner's or tailor's taste. Some order furniture upholstered in plain muslin, intending to use slipcovers only.

== History ==
In the days before home air conditioning was available, it was common to put slipcovers on upholstered furniture in the hot months of the year to protect the upholstery fabric from sweat. Slipcover tailors offered clear vinyl or plastic slipcovers. These clear plastic slipcovers were available in large department stores such as Jordan Marsh or custom-made by artisans.

In some cities in the northeast U.S., slipcover tailors were sometimes given the nickname "summertime millionaires" as their busy season was in the spring and summer. Custom slipcovering was done then, each one cut and sewn to order.

In the 1960s, technology and production techniques made it possible to manufacture furniture that could be sold at or below the price of a custom-made slipcover, and the practice of custom slipcovering for a time declined.

In recent years, there has been a renewed interest in custom slipcovering driven by the interior design industry and the popularity of the very casual shabby chic design style.

== Technology and materials ==
As this new "looser" fitting style of slipcovers does not always require custom tailoring, some furniture manufacturers are beginning to offer "ready-made" slipcovers.

Ready-made, generic fit slipcovers are available at many mainstream retailers that sell linens (sheets). With these generic fit slipcovers, some effort is required to maintain a tailored look of a slipcover applied to a couch or loveseat, as usage of the furniture will pull at the edges of the slipcover, which are tucked under the cushions, all of one piece. Manufacturers often provide foam sticks to tuck slipcovers into the sides and creases of couches. Design and materials used have also improved, allowing different kinds of generic slipcovers to be sold to consumers, including elastic covers that fit nearly perfectly around a couch, loosely fitted covers that are placed over key areas of a couch covers with skirts, and those made with material designed to withstand use from pets.

Custom-fitted slipcovers can resemble upholstery in their fit. They are fabricated to the exact shape of the furniture, and the cushions are slipcovered separately from the frame.

Slipcover material is usually a stretchable fabric, a polyester blend (polyester, cotton, and elastane). Bi-elastic fabric can be stretched both vertically and horizontally for a perfect fit. Strings or ribbons are used to keep the cover in place.

Slipcover fabrication is a specialty offered by slipcover makers. Some upholsterers and drapery workrooms also make slipcovers.

== Industry ==
Slipcovering skills are revived every generation by new groups that tend to change in characteristics over decades. Slipcover arts were once a close-guarded secret.

One constant is the cottage industry aspect: slipcovers are easily made by small groups in the home or home-based businesses. Historically, in a lower-wage occupation with a division of labor based on gender, slipcover sewers were often not taught or expected to cut.

Today, the trend is for more educated populations, more women, to choose this cottage industry product as a profession. Each one-person business tends to follow all the steps of marketing and manufacturing.

These one-person businesses may jointly market their services. The World Wide Web has contributed to the survival of slipcovering. Slipcover artists have found one another through networks or professional listings. Slipcover knowledge has lately been pooled and shared through this source.

However, the production of clear vinyl slipcovers is not as great as it used to be. Modern upholstery fabrics are more durable; they are both more resistant to dirt and easier to clean. Many upholstery fabrics can be washed in cold water without harm. Although pleasing to look at, transparent vinyl slipcovers are often very uncomfortable to sit on, particularly on hot summer days. These days, it is almost impossible to get clear vinyl slipcovers without customizing them.

== See also ==
- Cushion
- Foam rubber
- Sofa
