= La-Z-Boy =

American furniture company

La-Z-Boy Inc.
- Type: Public
- Traded as: NYSE: LZB; S&P 600 component
- Industry: Furniture
- Founded: 1927; 99 years ago
- Founders: Edward Knabusch; Edwin Shoemaker
- Headquarters: Monroe, Michigan, U.S.
- Number of locations: 531 (31. June 2022)
- Area served: United States; Canada; Australia; United Kingdom; Germany; Indonesia; Italy; Japan; Mexico; New Zealand; Turkey; South Africa
- Key people: Melinda Whittington (president and CEO)
- Products: Upholstered furniture and casegoods
- Revenue: ▲US$2.13 billion (2026)
- Net income: ▲US$102 million (2026)
- Number of employees: 11,500 (FY 2021)
- Subsidiaries: England Furniture Incorporated
- Website: www.la-z-boy.com

La-Z-Boy Inc. (pronounced "lazy boy") is an American furniture manufacturer based in Monroe, Michigan, United States, that makes home furniture, including upholstered recliners, sofas, stationary chairs, lift chairs, and sleeper sofas. The company employs more than 11,000 people.

La-Z-Boy furniture is sold in retail residential outlets in the United States and Canada and is manufactured and distributed under license in other countries including the United Kingdom, Australia, Germany, Indonesia, Italy, Japan, Mexico, New Zealand, Turkey, South Africa, Kuwait and Qatar. La-Z-Boy holds US and international patents on more than 200 different styles and mechanisms.

The wholesale segment includes England, La-Z-Boy, American Drew, Hammary, Kincaid and the company's international wholesale and manufacturing businesses. The company-owned retail segment includes approximately 165 La-Z-Boy Furniture Galleries stores out of about 350. Joybird is an e-commerce retailer and manufacturer of upholstered furniture.

== History ==
=== Early history ===
In 1927, cousins Edward M. Knabusch and Edwin J. Shoemaker partnered and invested in the furniture business in the town of Monroe, Michigan. They set out to design a chair for what they called "nature's way of relaxing." Using orange crates to mock-up and refine their idea, they invented a wood-slat porch chair with a reclining mechanism. Knabusch and Shoemaker then upholstered their innovation and marketed it as a year-round chair. The chair was a success; they held a contest to name it—La-Z-Boy was the winner.

In 1969, after years primarily as a manufacturer of recliners, La-Z-Boy started designing other products including reclining sofas, sleep sofas and modular groups. 1981 sales were $150 million. In 1983, La-Z-Boy introduced its first line of stationary sofas and occasional chairs, later offering a full line of home furnishings. In 1985, Charles Knabusch, son of Edward Knasbuch, became the Chairman and CEO of the company.

=== The LADD Furniture deal, decline, and recovery ===
Richard R. Allen, Don A. Hunziker and William O. Fenn borrowed $70 million to buy Lea, American Drew and Daystrom from Sperry & Hutchinson in 1981. LADD, whose name came from the three companies, began trading publicly in 1982. LADD was the third-largest American maker of furniture for homes, with over $600 million in sales, when it bought six Maytag businesses in 1990. LADD Industries moved from High Point, North Carolina, to Grandover in Greensboro, North Carolina, in November 1997, becoming the first company to locate its headquarters there. At the time it was the fifth-largest American furniture maker, with $500 million in sales, and the brands American Drew, American of Martinsville, Barclay, Clayton Marcus, Lea, Pennsylvania House, and Pilliod. In September 1999, La-Z-Boy, at the time the largest American upholstered furniture manufacturer, bought LADD, the seventh-largest American furniture maker, for $197.8 million in stock and $101.5 million in assumed debt. Saul Cutler of BDO Seidman said the deal "sets up La-Z-Boy as an industry behemoth." The deal, approved in January 2000, gave La-Z-Boy $2 billion in sales and made it one of the country's two largest furniture makers, Furniture Brands International being the other.

On July 23, 2001, La-Z-Boy announced the LADD name would cease to exist. John J. Case, president of La-Z-Boy Residential, moved to head the new La-Z-Boy upholstery group, which included Bauhaus, Centurion, Clayton Marcus, England, HickoryMark, La-Z-Boy, Sam Moore and La-Z-Boy Contract Furniture. Don L. Mitchell, who headed the LADD casegoods group, would take the same job at the La-Z-Boy casegoods group, including Alexvale, American Drew, Hammary, Kincaid, Lea, Pennsylvania House, Pilliod, and American of Martinsville.

La-Z-Boy logo from 2003 to 2025.

Competition from China hurt many American furniture makers, and particularly La-Z-Boy's strategy of buying LADD to improve its casegoods position. In 2005, La-Z-Boy chairman Pat Norton called the LADD deal "the biggest mistake that I have ever made in the furniture industry." Pilliod was the first LADD division sold, to Michels & Co. in December 2001. Barclay was closed. American of Martinsville was sold to Hancock Park Associates in November 2006. Sixteen of the former LADD plants had been sold or closed. On September 6, 2007, La-Z-Boy announced the sale of Pennsylvania House to Universal Furniture. Later that month came the sale of Clayton Marcus to Sun Capital affiliate Lexington-Rowe, leaving only American Drew and Lea among the LADD divisions. Also sold was the Sam Moore division, in February 2007 to Hooker Furniture. La-Z-Boy was still number three, with $1.5 billion in shipments.

In November 2006, High Point offered $600,000 to the La-Z-Boy division that was formerly LADD to move its headquarters back.

Late in 2006, La-Z-Boy had 7,000 employees, down from 13,000 six years earlier. The company began working on its image, telling consumers the company offered more than recliners. The company reduced its warehouses from twelve to five and announced plans to add 50 New Generation stores to the 334 the company already had; half of those used the new format already.

Late in 2014, La-Z-Boy announced the closing of Lea after an unsuccessful attempt to find someone to buy the company. The High Point office would continue operations for American Drew, Hammary, and Kincaid.

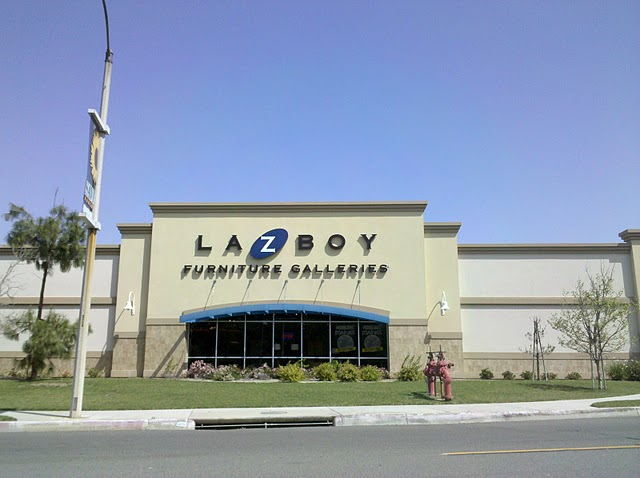
A location at the Savi Ranch Center in Yorba Linda

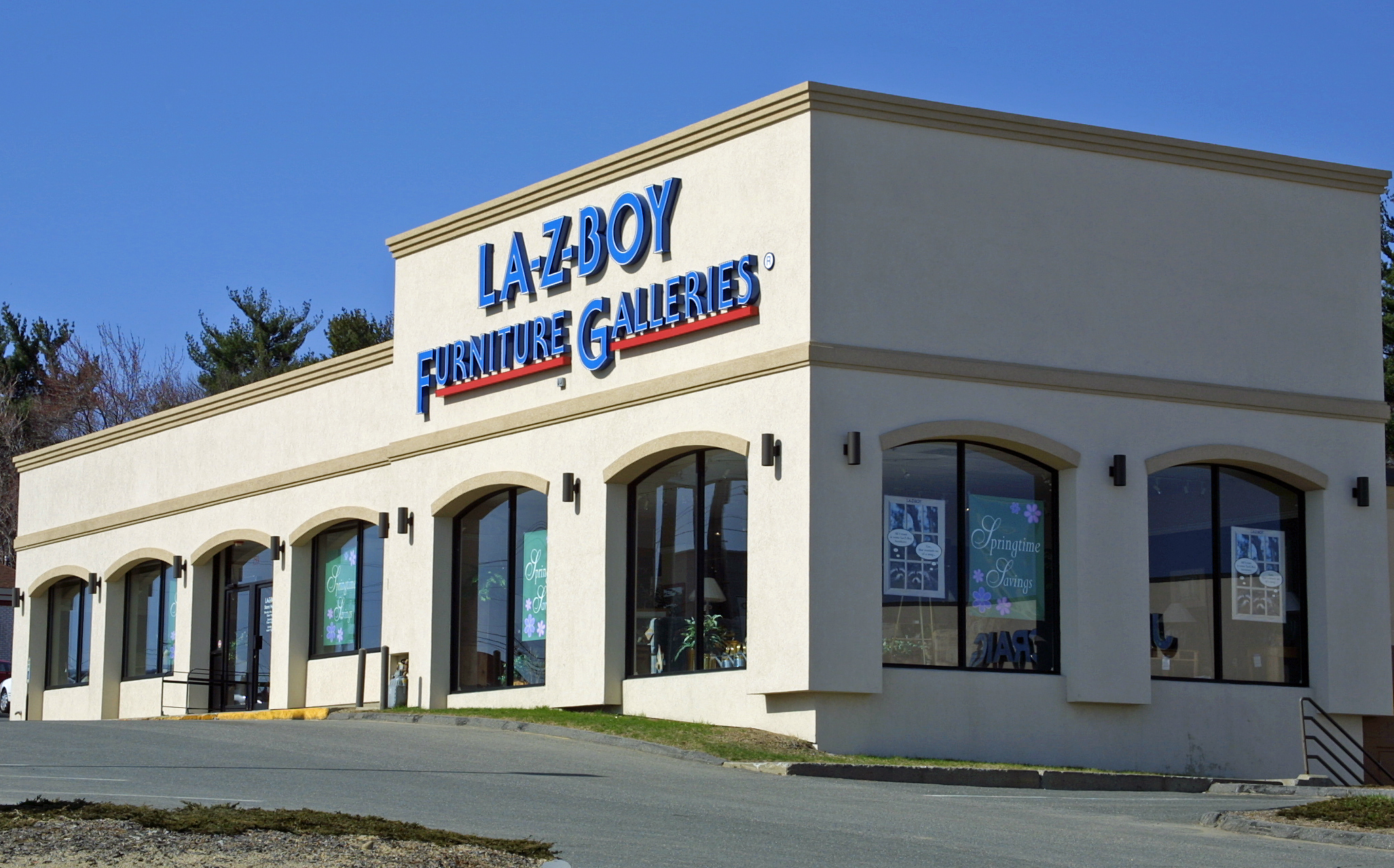
La-Z-Boy Furniture Gallery on Rte. 1 in Saugus, Massachusetts, in 2001

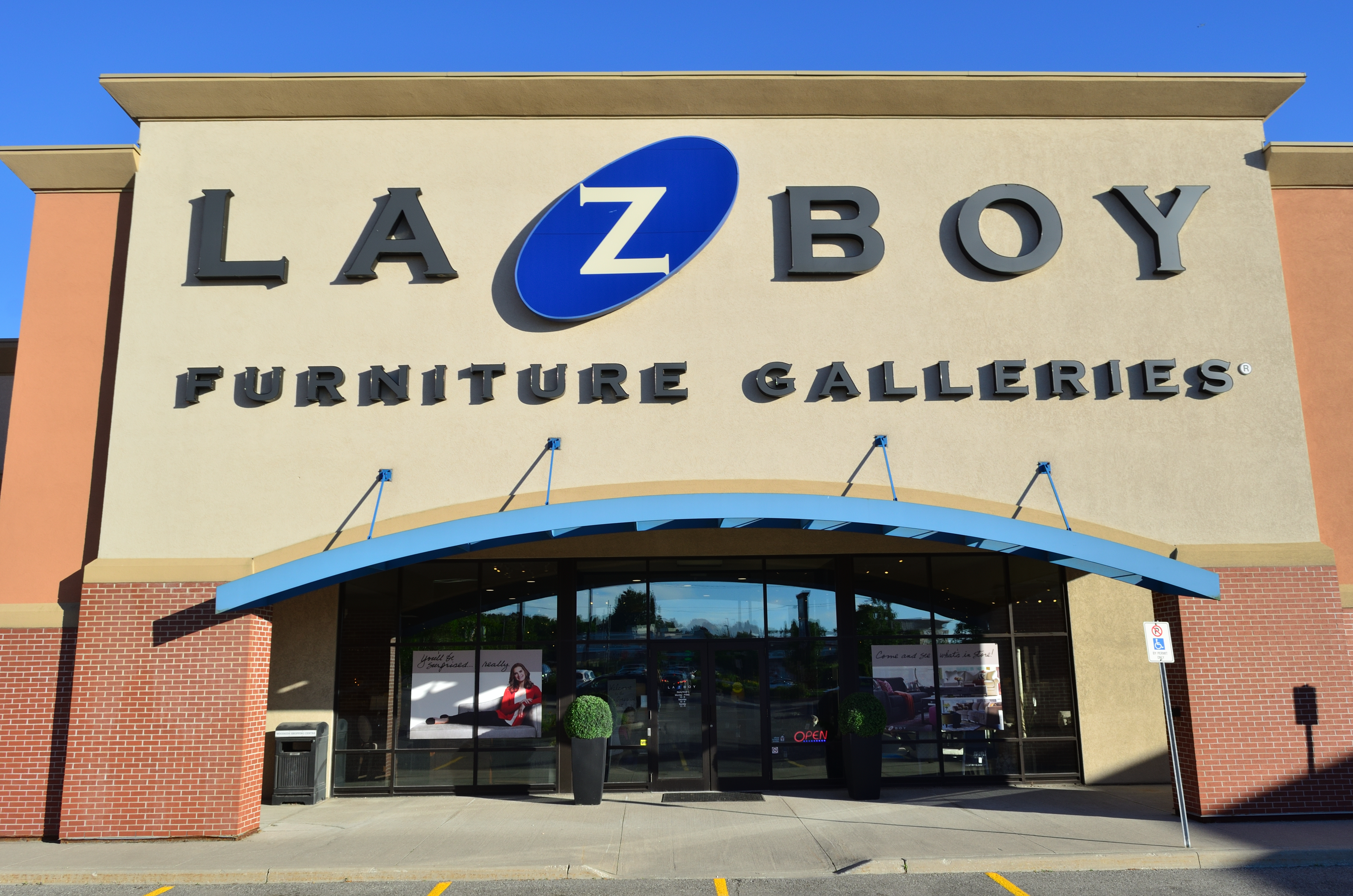
La-Z-Boy in Markham, Ontario

== Licensed manufacturers ==
In 1970, Morgan Furniture of Takapuna, New Zealand, founded by Jack Morgan, commenced manufacture of the La-Z-Boy recliner for Australia and New Zealand. In September 2007 his son Graham Morgan announced that the company was to import the furniture from China and Thailand with the loss of around 200 Auckland manufacturing jobs.

== In media ==
The 2024 film Here includes a storyline involving a fictionalized depiction of the La-Z-Boy's invention.

== See also ==
- Barcalounger
