= Edward J. Barcalo =

American businessman

- Born: 1870; Mount Morris, New York, United States
- Died: 1963 (aged 92–93)
- Occupation: Businessman
- Known for: Founding the Barcalo Manufacturing Company

Edward Joel Barcalo (1870–1963) was an American businessman, noted for founding the Barcalo Manufacturing Company (now the Barcalounger Company), perhaps best known for the Barcalounger. He was born in Mt. Morris, in the state of New York. Living in Buffalo, New York, Barcolo founded the Barcalo Manufacturing Company in 1896: it originally produced tools, but expanded into the furniture market. By the early 1950s the company had over 550 employees.

== Career ==
In 1916, he served as the president of the Associated Manufacturers of New York State.

Barcalo received a patent for the invention of a bed spring.
