= Sunlounger =

Chair-like outdoor furniture

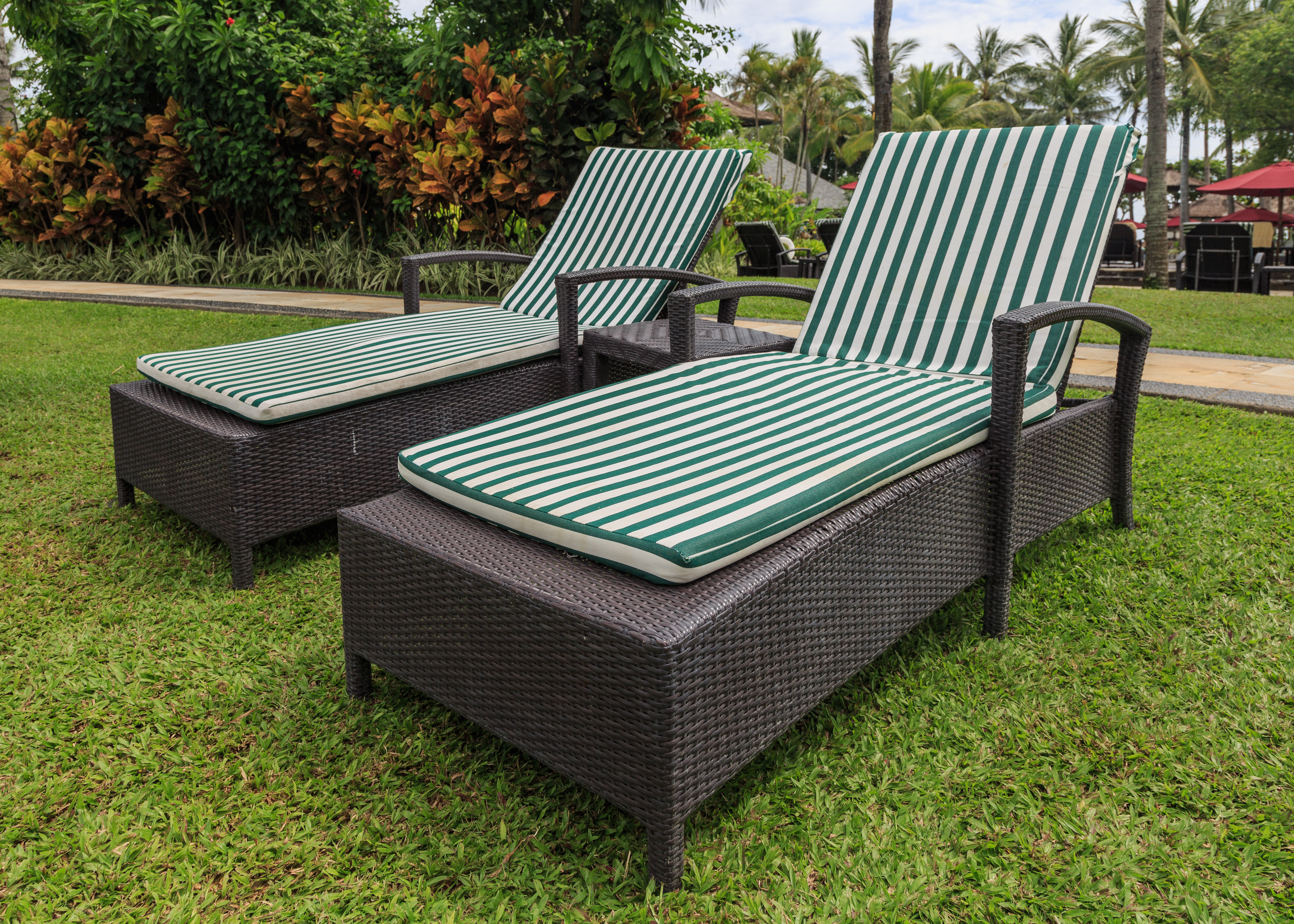
Sunloungers on a lawn

A sunlounger (British "sun lounger") is a chair-like device, typically placed in a patio, garden, or swimming pool deck, or used as beach-side outdoor furniture.

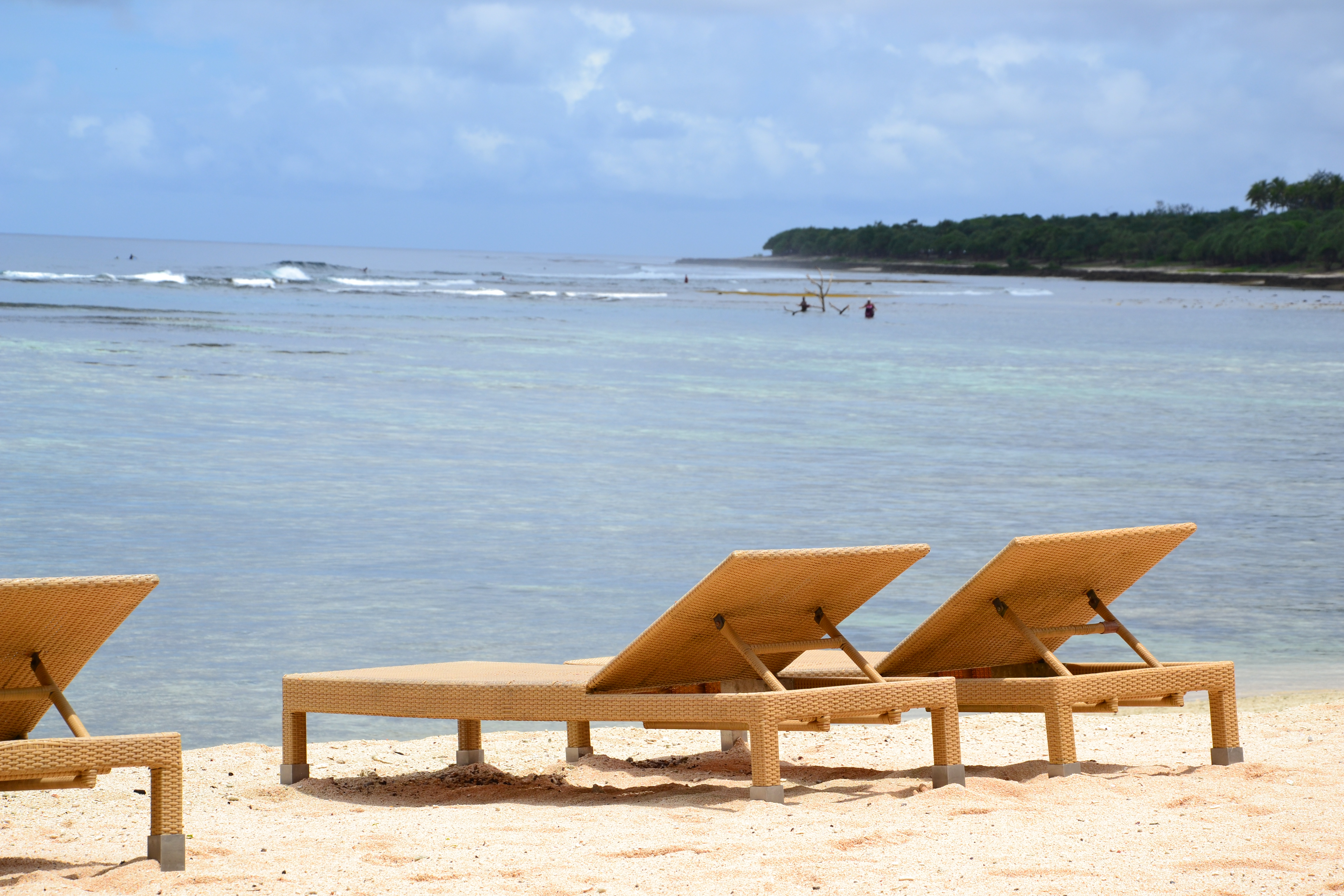
Sunloungers from the back

They are often constructed from wood, formed plastic, or metal and indoor fabrics. They have designed adjustable backs for people to lie down, or sit up on, (recline) while relaxing. Somewhat like a deckchair and bed-like in nature, the rear surface can be up to allow the user to sit up and read, or it can be reclined to a flat surface to allow sleeping in the horizontal position (supine and prone position).

== Use ==
They are popular and widespread across tourist resorts in Europe and also by swimming pools.

== See also ==
- Folding chair
- Deckchair
- Recliner
