= Charles Knabusch =

American businessman and CEO (1939–1997)

- Born: Charles Thayer Knabusch; November 25, 1939; Monroe, Michigan, U.S
- Died: October 14, 1997 (aged 57); High Point, North Carolina, U.S
- Education: Cleary Business College
- Organization: La-Z-Boy (1972−1997)
- Spouse: June Heck (m. 1962)
- Children: 4
- Parents: Edward Knabusch (father); Henrietta Muehleisen (mother)

Charles Thayer Knabusch (November 25, 1939 − October 14, 1997) was an American businessman who served as the Chairman and CEO of the American furniture company La-Z-Boy from 1985 to 1997. He previously served as the President of La-Z-Boy from 1972 to 1985.

== Early life and education ==
Knabusch was born on November 25, 1939 in Monroe, Michigan, to parents Edward Knabusch and Henrietta Muehleisen. He attended Monroe High School and Cleary Business College in Ypsilanti, getting a degree in law.

== Career ==
Knabusch began working in the Monroe Payroll Department in 1961, and later became the President of La-Z-Boy in 1972. He established the La-Z-Boy Museum & Archives in 1984. He later became the CEO and Chairman of the company in 1985, following his father's resignation. In 1994, Knabusch was named among the US' ten outstanding business leaders by Northwood University.

== Personal life ==
Knabusch was married to June E. Knabusch (née Heck), being married since June 1962. They later had four children. On October 14, 1997, Knabusch died in High Point, North Carolina after suffering from a heart attack. He was 57.
