= Edward Knabusch =

American businessman (1900–1988)

- Born: January 7, 1900; Frenchtown Township, Michigan, U.S
- Died: February 25, 1988 (aged 88)
- Known for: Founding La-Z-Boy
- Spouse: Henrietta Muehleisen (m. 1927)
- Children: 2, including Charles
- Relatives: Edwin Shoemaker (cousin)

Edward M. Knabusch (January 7, 1900 − February 25, 1988) was an American businessman who founded the furniture company La-Z-Boy with his cousin Edwin Shoemaker.

== Early life ==
Knabusch was born on January 7, 1900 in the Frenchtown Township in Monroe County, Michigan. He finished school in the eighth grade, to help with his family's auto equipment business.

== Career ==
Knabusch founded the La-Z-Boy company in 1927 with his cousin Edwin Shoemaker. Knabusch became the president of the company soon after. Knabusch resigned in 1982.

== Personal life ==
Knabusch married Henrietta Muehleisen and had two children. One of which, Charles Knabusch, became the successor board chairman and president. Knabusch died on February 25, 1988. He was 88.
