= Divan (furniture) =

Couch-like sitting furniture

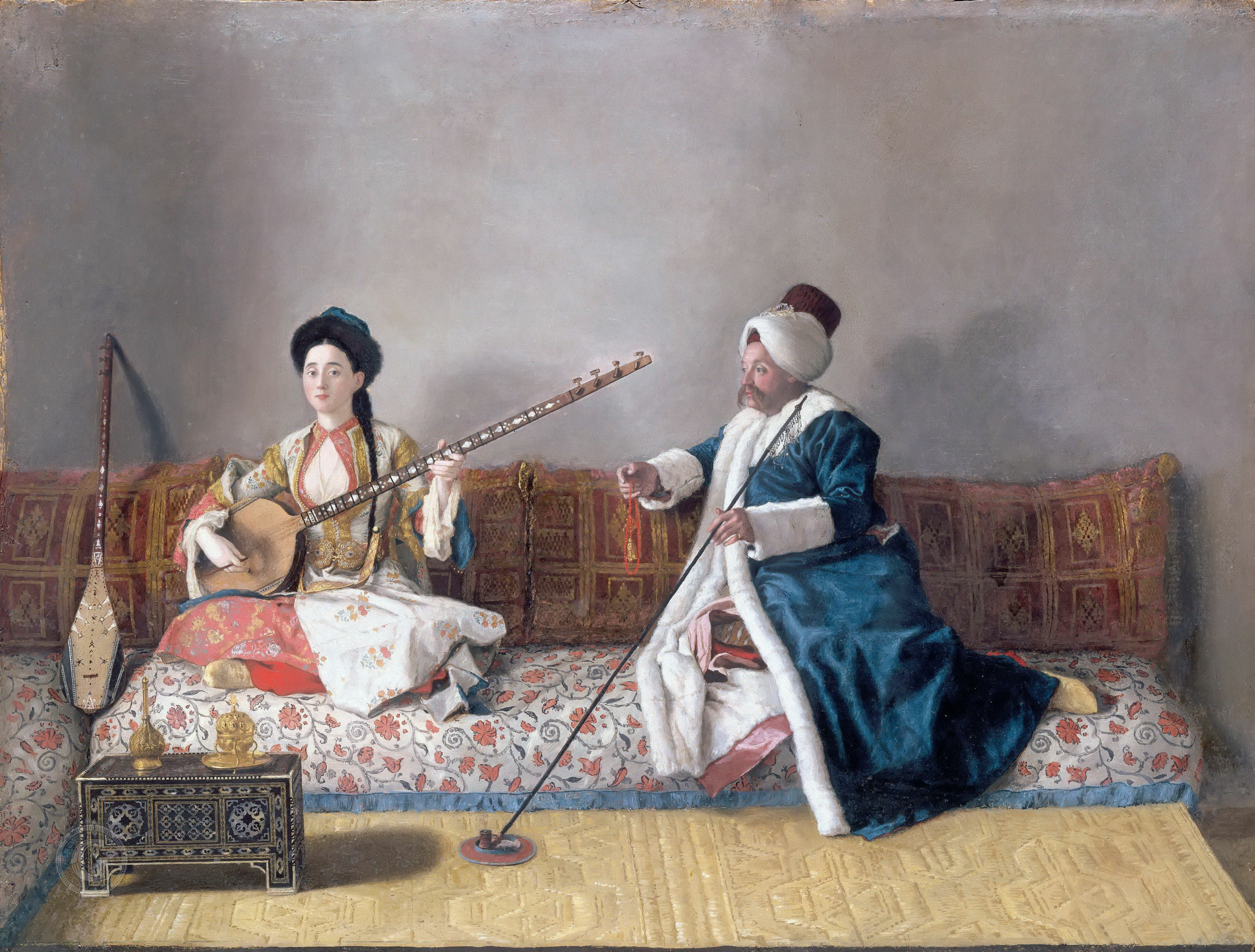
Portrait de Monsieur Levett et Mademoiselle Glavany Assis Sur un Divan en Costume Turc by Jean-Étienne Liotard (Louvre)

A divan is a piece of couch-like sitting furniture or, in some regions, a box-spring-based bed.

Primarily found in West Asia (especially the area of the former Ottoman Empire), a divan is a long seat formed of a mattress laid against the side of the room, upon the floor, or a raised structure or frame, with cushions to lean against.

Divans received this name because they were generally found along the walls in Middle Eastern council chambers of a bureau called divan or diwan (from Persian, meaning a government council or office, from the bundles of papers they processed, and next to their council chambers).

Divans are a common feature of the liwan, a long, vaulted, narrow room in Levantine homes. The divan in the sense of a sofa or couch entered the English language in 1702 and has been commonly known in Europe since about the middle of the 18th century. It was fashionable, roughly from 1820 to 1850, wherever the romantic movement in literature penetrated. All the boudoirs of that generation were garnished with divans. They spread to coffee-houses, sometimes known as divans or Turkish divans, and a cigar divan remains a familiar expression. This is preserved today in Bulgarian, and in Hungarian as dívány, Italian as Divano, in Estonian as diivan, in Polish as dywan, in Romanian and Spanish as divan, and Russian as диван (divan).

== See also ==
- Ottoman (furniture)
- Chaise longue
- Divan (Mughal architecture)
