= HSM (company) =

American company

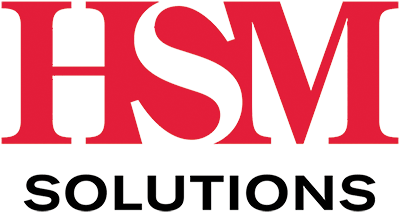
- Trade name: HSM
- Type: Private
- Industry: Manufacturing
- Founded: 1944
- Founder: Parks Underdown
- Headquarters: Hickory, North Carolina, U.S.
- Area served: Worldwide
- Key people: Mark S. Jones President and CEO
- Revenue: Undisclosed
- Number of employees: 2,500 (May, 2013)
- Divisions: HSM Transportation, Hickory Springs, PTI, Atlantic Automation Company
- Website: www.hsmsolutions.com

HSM is an American company globally manufacturing materials and components for transportation, furniture, bedding and other markets. It is a privately held company that is family-owned, based in Hickory, North Carolina, where it was originally founded in 1944 by Parks Underdown as the "Hickory Springs Manufacturing Company." In May 2013, the firm announced it was being rebranded as "HSM."

The company operates 25 plants employing over 2,500 workers in 13 states.

== Overview ==
In March 2013, the company restructured into four business units: transportation, furniture, bedding, and other markets. On May 6, 2013, a rebranding initiative consolidated several brand names and divisions under the trade name HSM, standing for "High-value Solutions Manufacturing."

The C.E. White Company was acquired in 2012 to add capabilities in bus seating. A Corporate Innovation and Technology Center opened in 2012, offering R&D in advanced materials and manufacturing processes . In April 2013, the company broke ground for a 10,000-square-foot, $1.5 million foam technology facility in Conover, North Carolina.

HSM produces polyurethane reticulated foam formulations, drawn wire, springs, formed metal products, and fiber components. Its integrated component systems include transportation seating, motion mechanism systems, and bed builds.

== Leadership ==
Mark S. Jones, president and chief executive officer:
