= IKEA Klippan =

Piece of furniture sold by IKEA

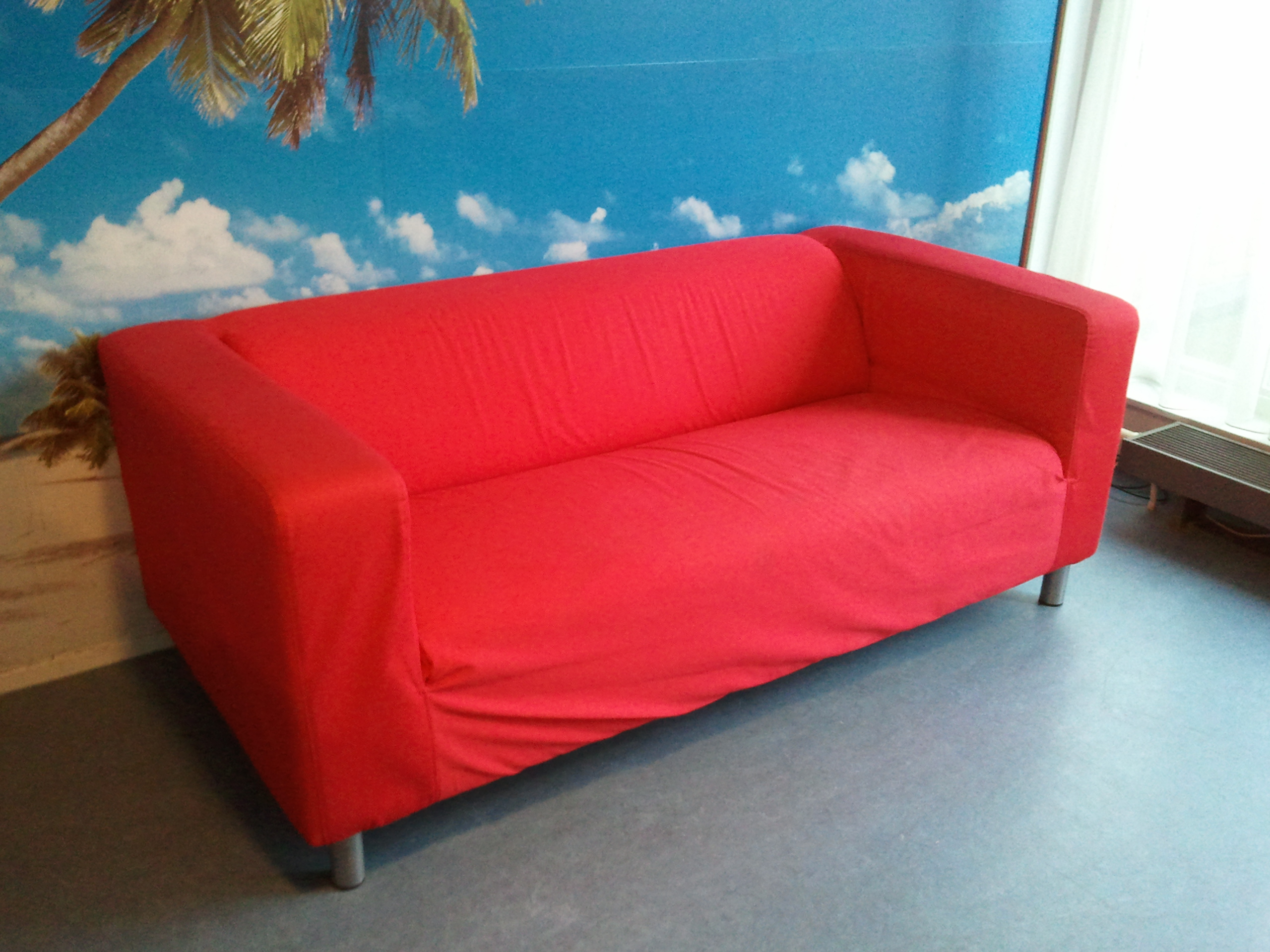
A typical Klippan sofa

Klippan (stylised as KLIPPAN, Swedish: the cliff) is a model of sofa manufactured and sold by IKEA. IKEA's nomenclature conventions name upholstered furniture after places in Sweden. The Klippan sofa is named after Klippan Municipality in Southern Sweden. Klippan was developed by IKEA's product developer and head of design Lars Engman and designer Noboru Nakamura. It was launched in 1980 and continues to be one of IKEA's most popular and longstanding products. It comes in a standard two-seat size (which fits easily through standard house doorways) and can be fitted with a range of removable and interchangeable fabric covers. As well as standard cotton covers, IKEA sells 'exclusive' collections of covers, retiring designs after a year.

Several functional changes have occurred to the Klippan over the past 30 years. The initial model featured a solid wood frame. Contemporary models have replaced this with a less expensive, lightweight frame of combined particleboard, fiberboard, and polyurethane foam. Likewise, while earlier models stood on painted wood legs, contemporary Klippan legs are made from steel or aluminum. In 2004, the sofa was redesigned to be easily flat-packed and assembled at home. Adjustments to the materials used in the sofa and the centralization of production methods allowed IKEA to reduce the price of the Klippan sofa by 40% since 1980.

In 2003, the Klippan was used as the standard sofa in a test to compare British fire safety requirements with those of Sweden and mainland Europe. Three Klippans were used: one with no flame retardant treatment, one with phosphorus-based flame retardant, and one with bromine-based flame retardant. All three sofas were specially manufactured by IKEA in its workshops at Älmhult.

In 2005, a large orange Klippan was installed in Frogmoor township to celebrate the opening of a nearby IKEA store. The Klippan was one of two IKEA items to be replicated at five times the size.
