= Couch =

Furniture for seating multiple people

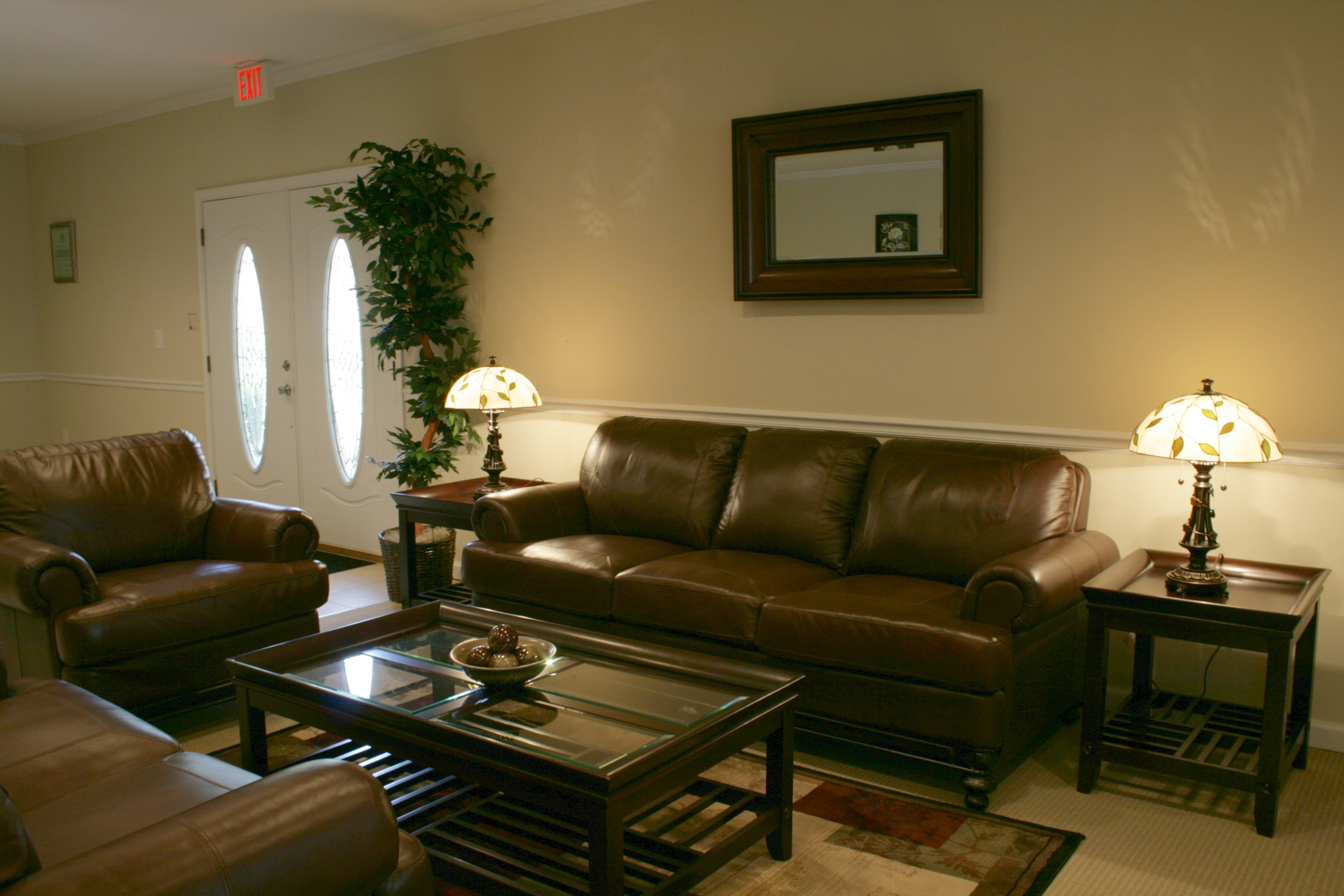
A three-cushion couch in an office lobby

A couch, also known as a sofa, settee, chesterfield, or davenport, is a cushioned piece of furniture that can seat multiple people. It is commonly found in the form of a bench with upholstered armrests and is often fitted with springs and tailored cushion and pillows. Although a couch is used primarily for seating, it may be used for sleeping. In homes, couches are normally put in the family room, living room, den, or lounge. They are sometimes also found in non-residential settings such as hotels, lobbies of commercial offices, waiting rooms, and bars. Couches can also vary in size, color, and design.

== Etymology ==
The term couch originally denoted an item of furniture for lying or sleeping on. Couch is predominantly used in North America, Australia, South Africa, and Ireland, whereas the terms sofa and settee (U and non-U) are most commonly used in the United Kingdom and India. The word couch originated in Middle English from the Old French noun couche, which derived from the verb meaning "to lie down".

The word sofa comes from the Turkish language and is derived from the Arabic word suffah ("ledge/bench"), cognates with the Aramaic word sippa ("mat"). Nathan Bailey in his Dictionarium Britannicum (1730) defines sofa as "a sort of alcove much used in Asia ... furnished with rich carpets and cushions."

The word settee or setee comes from the Old English word setl, which was used to describe long benches with high backs and arms, but is now generally used to describe small upholstered seating structures. Both "sofa" and "settee" terms came into use in the beginning of the 18th century. Originally the settee defined a smaller sofa, but by the 20th century the distinction was lost.

Other terms which can be synonymous with the above definition are divan, davenport, lounge, and canapé. In Canadian English, the word chesterfield is used to describe any couch or sofa, particularly among older Canadians. According to a 1992 survey conducted in the Golden Horseshoe region of Ontario, the term is quickly vanishing.

== Types ==
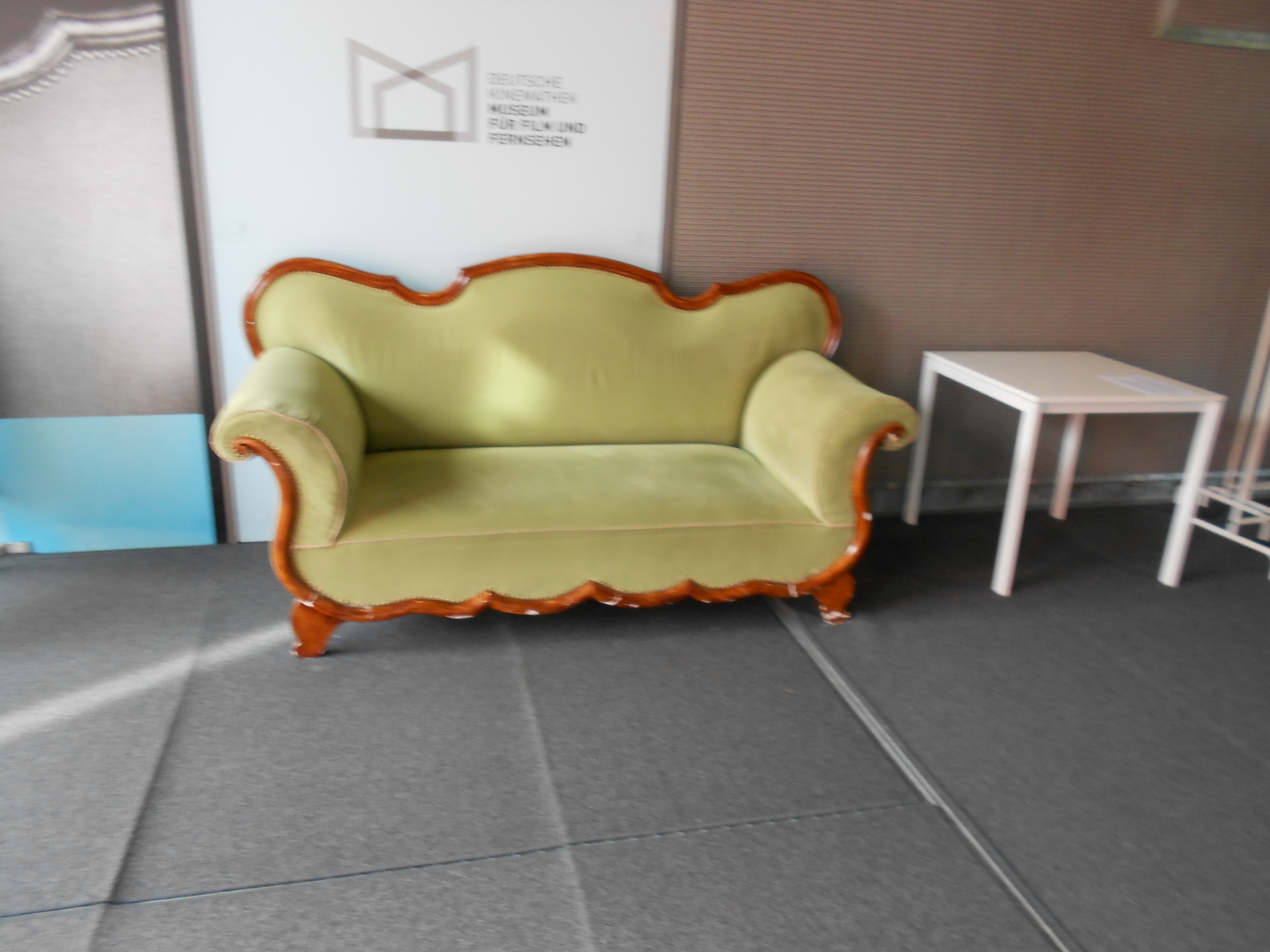
Loriot's sofa at the Deutsche Kinemathek museum, 2012

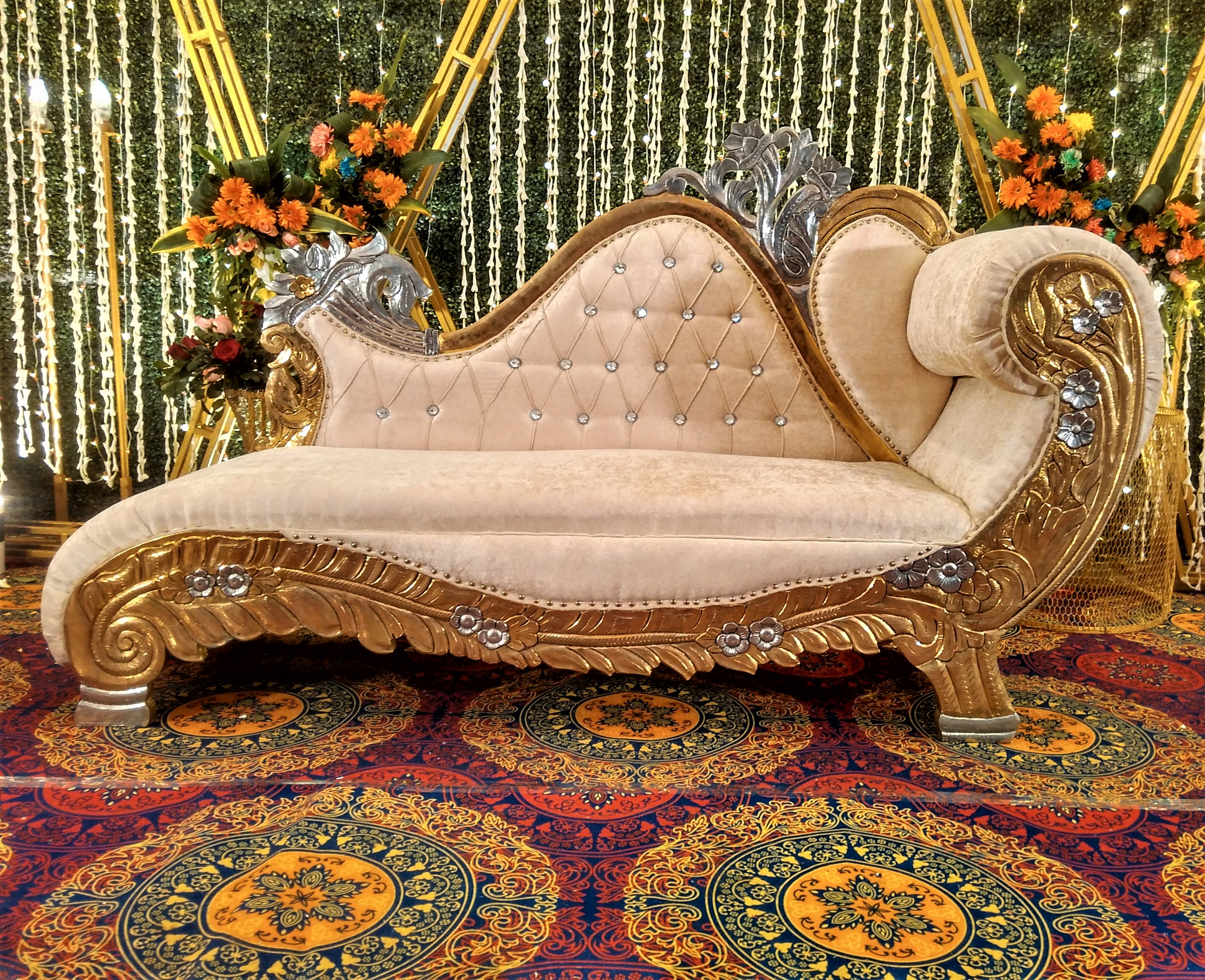
Wedding Couch, Asansol, West Bengal, India

The most common types of couches include the two-seater, sometimes referred to as a loveseat, and the sofa. The loveseat is designed for seating two people, while the sofa has more than two cushion seats. A sectional sofa, often just referred to as a "sectional", is formed from multiple sections (typically two, three, or four) and usually includes at least two pieces which join at an angle of 90 degrees or slightly greater. Sectional sofas are used to wrap around walls or other furniture.

Other variants include the divan, the fainting couch (backless or partial-backed) and the canapé (an ornamental three-seater). To conserve space, some sofas double as beds in the form of sofa beds, daybeds, or futons.

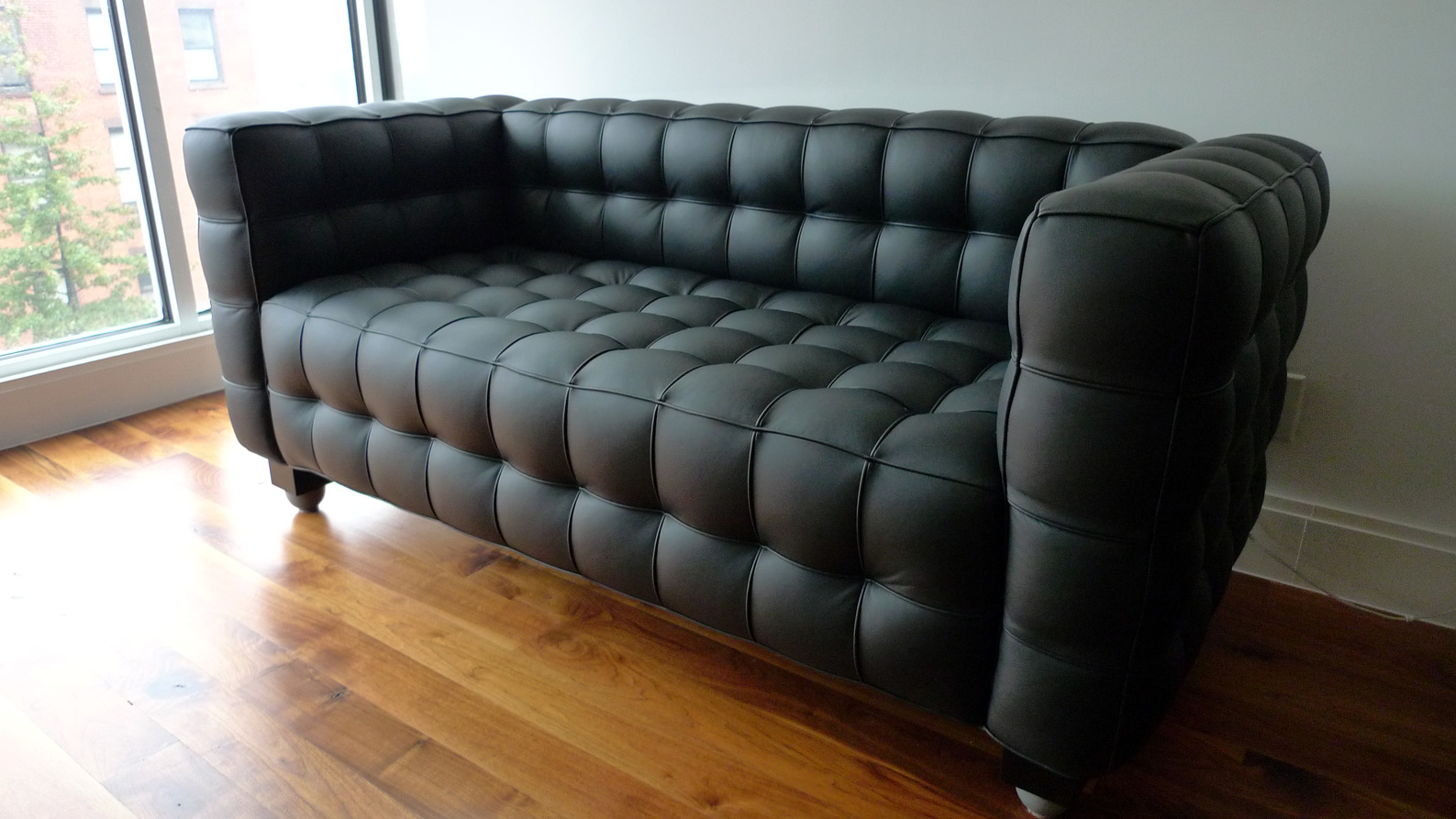
A Kubus sofa by Josef Hoffmann (1910)

A furniture set consisting of a sofa with two matching chairs is known as a "chesterfield suite" or "living-room suite". In the UK and Canada, the word chesterfield was used to refer to any couch in the 1900s. A chesterfield now describes a deep buttoned sofa, usually made from leather, with arms and back of the same height. The first chesterfield, with its distinctive deep buttoned, quilted leather upholstery and lower seat base, was commissioned by Philip Stanhope, 4th Earl of Chesterfield (1694–1773).

== Materials ==
A couch consists of a frame, springs, padding, and a covering. The frame is usually made of wood, but can also be made of steel, plastic or laminated boards. Sofa padding is made from foam, down, feathers, fabric or a combination thereof. Sofa coverings are usually made out of soft leather, corduroy or linen. Couches commonly have springs under the padding for more support, although some don't.

== Image gallery ==
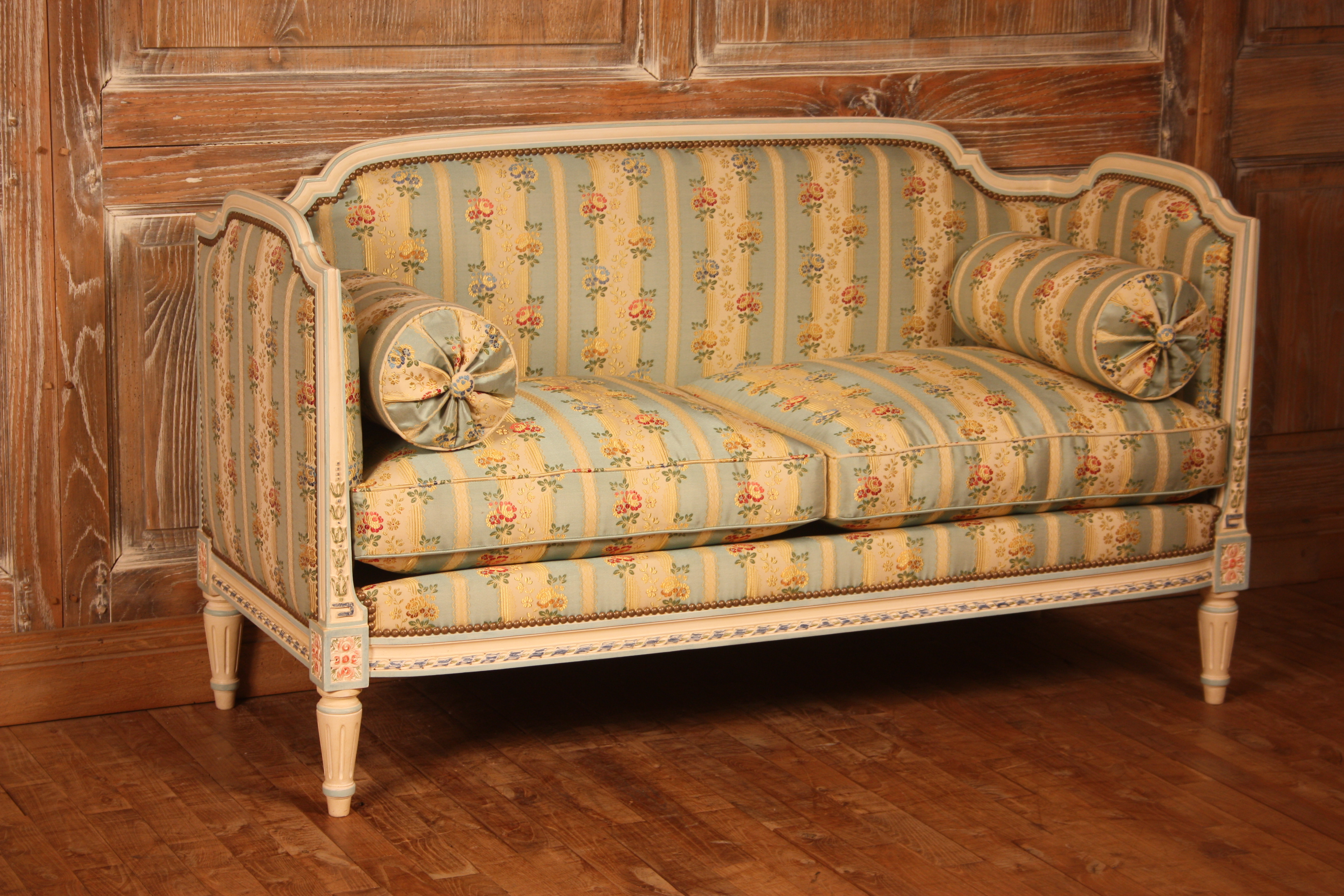
A two-seater upholstered loveseat

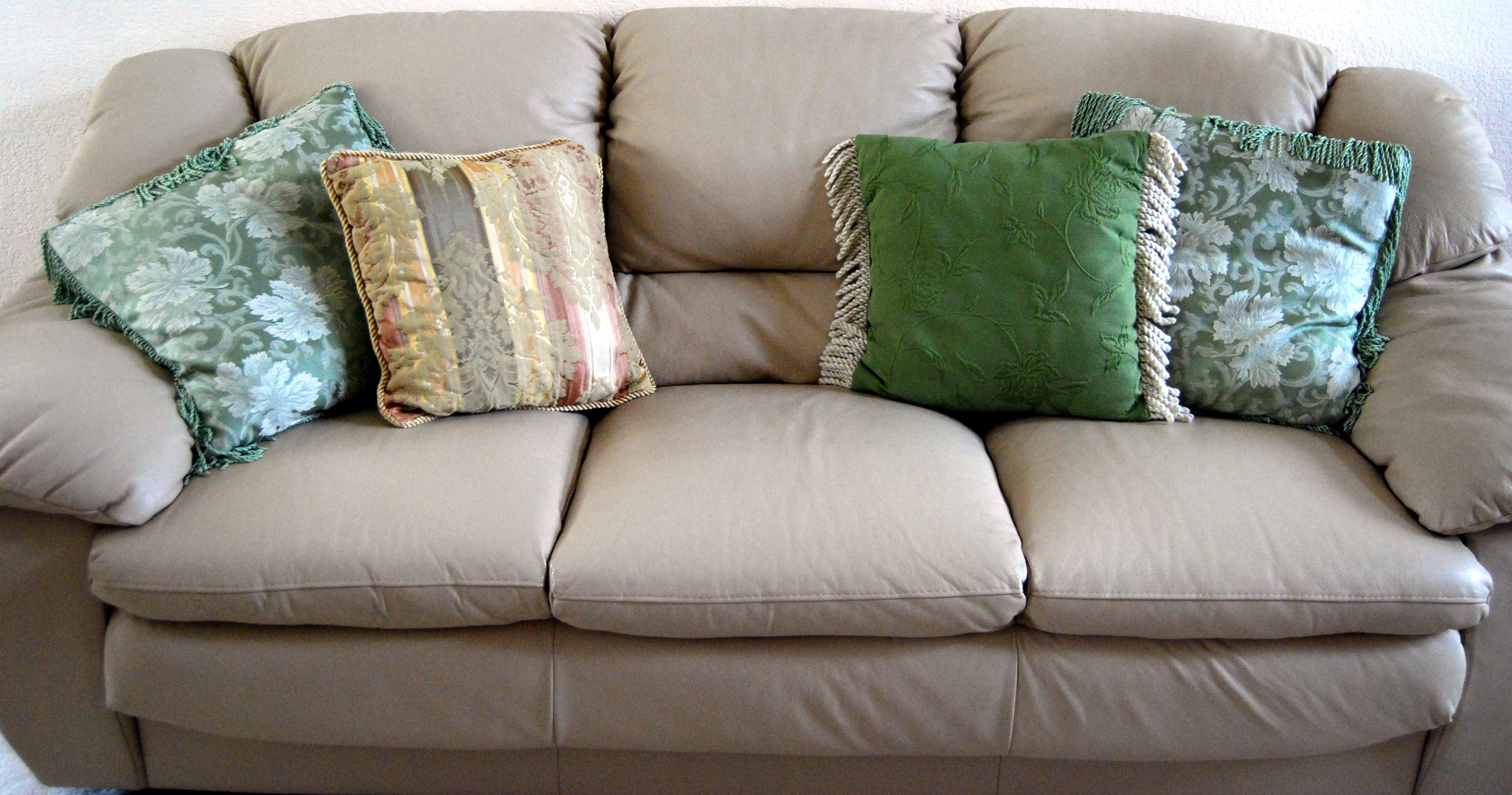
A leather couch

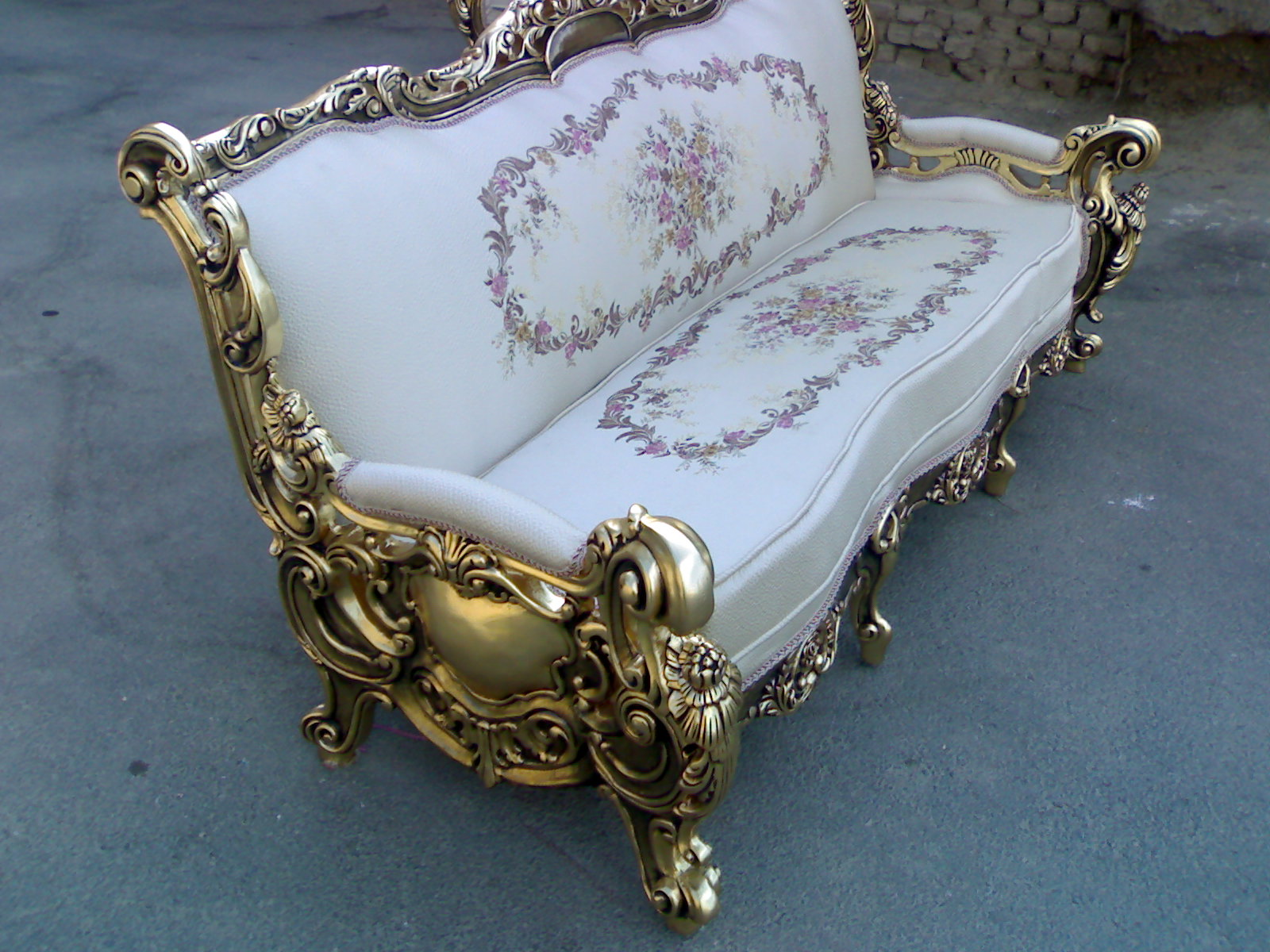
Sofa steel production malayer

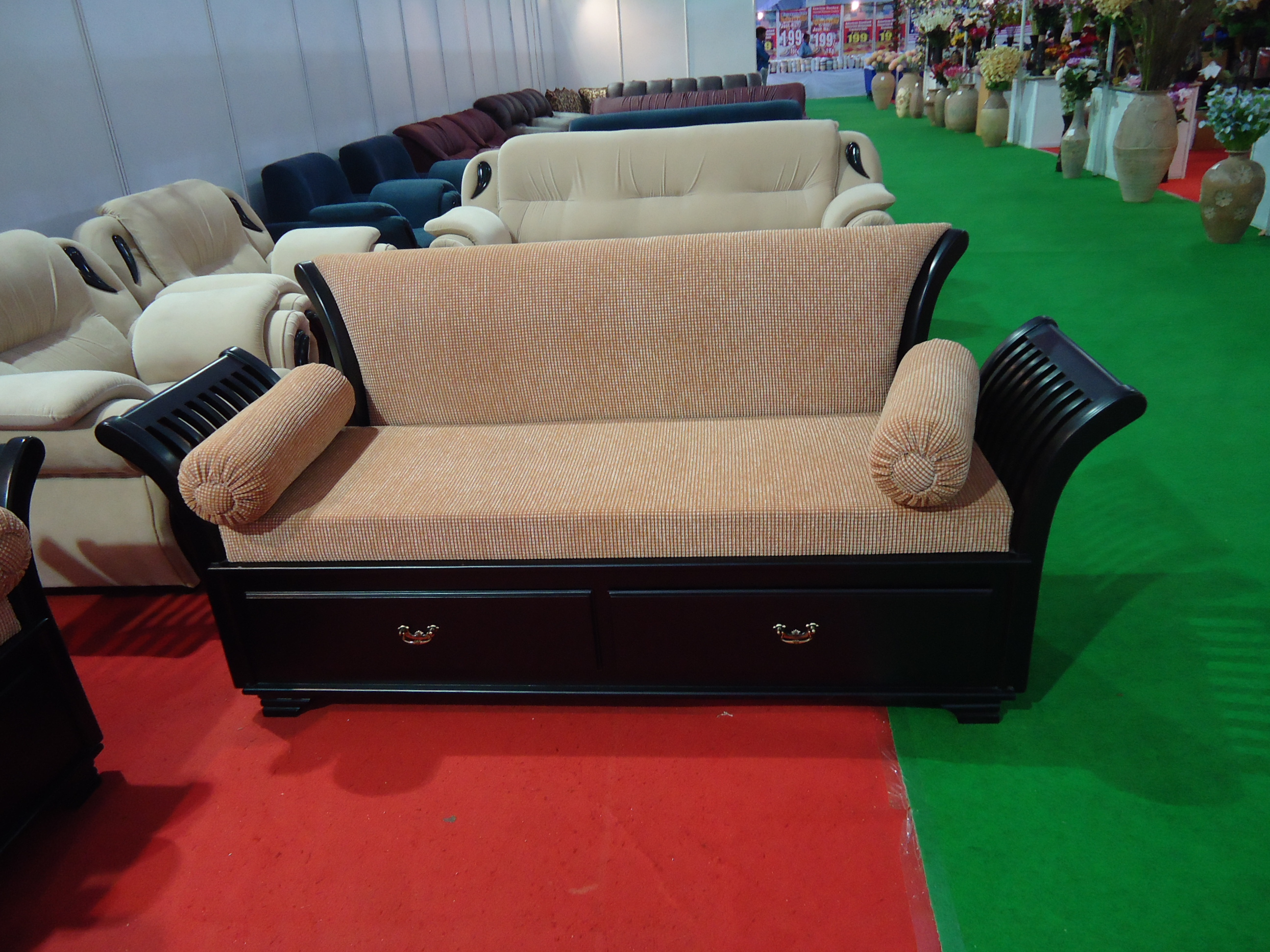
An upholstered couch

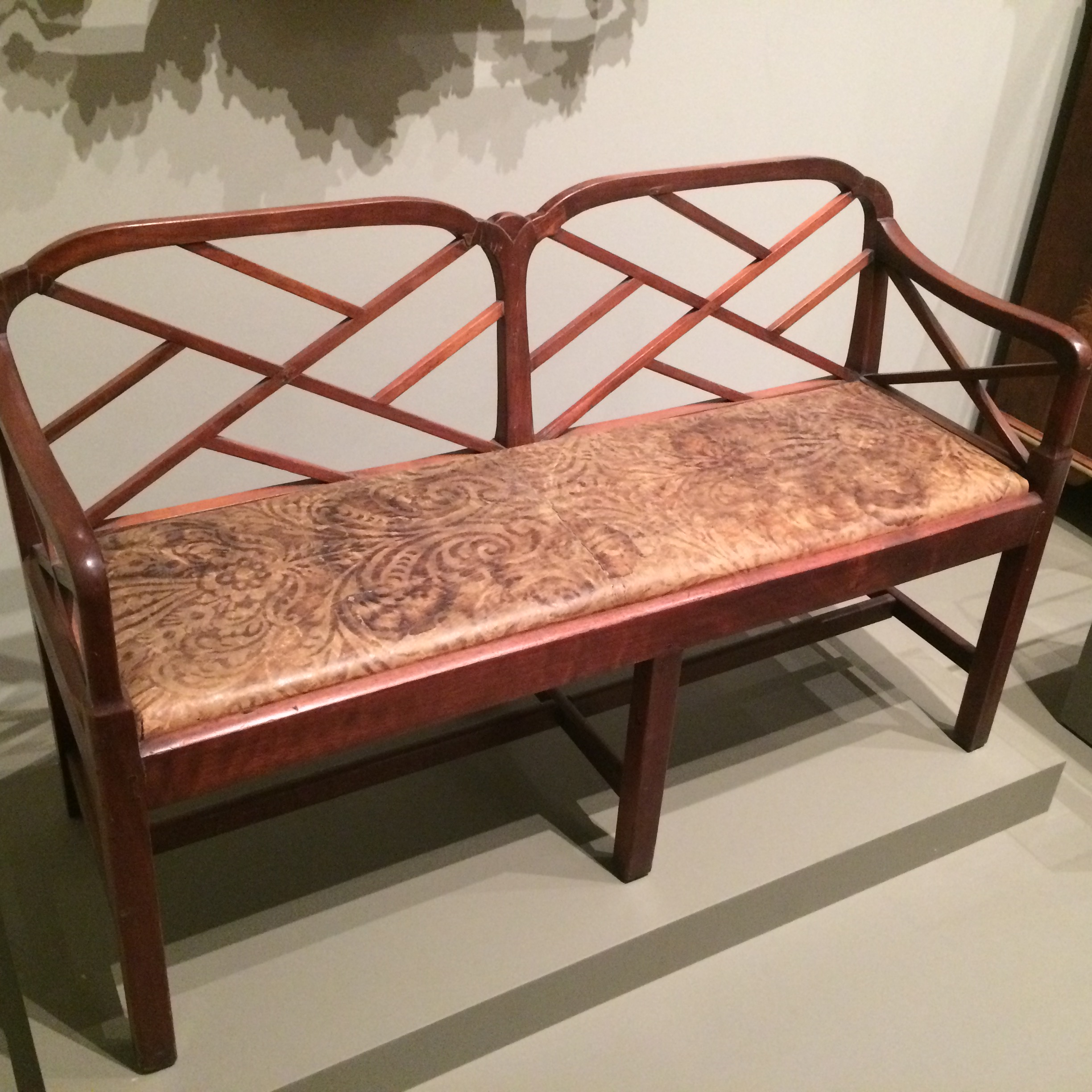
English Settee, c. 1770

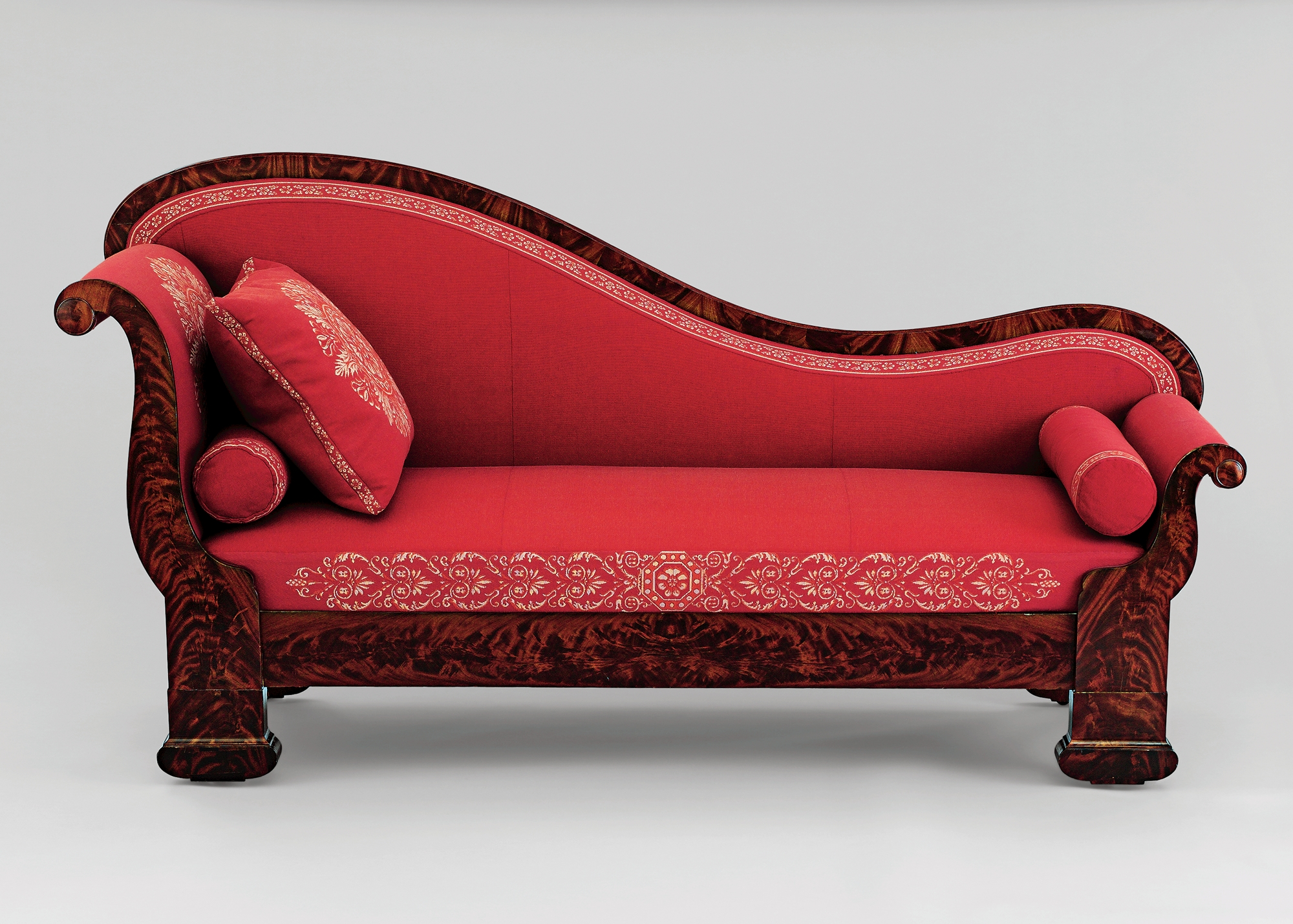
Roman style couch for reclining

== See also ==
- Bean bag chair
- Chaise longue, a similar elongated piece intended for a single person
- Couch potato
- Davenport (sofa)
- Divan (furniture)
- Klippan (sofa)
- Ottoman (furniture)
- Settle (furniture), wooden furniture with similar usage
- Slipcover
- Wing chair
- Window seat (type of sofa)

== General and cited references ==
- Gloag, John; Edwards, Clive (1991). A Complete Dictionary of Furniture. Woodstock, N.Y: Overlook Books. ISBN 0-87951-414-0.
