= Chaise longue =

Upholstered chair

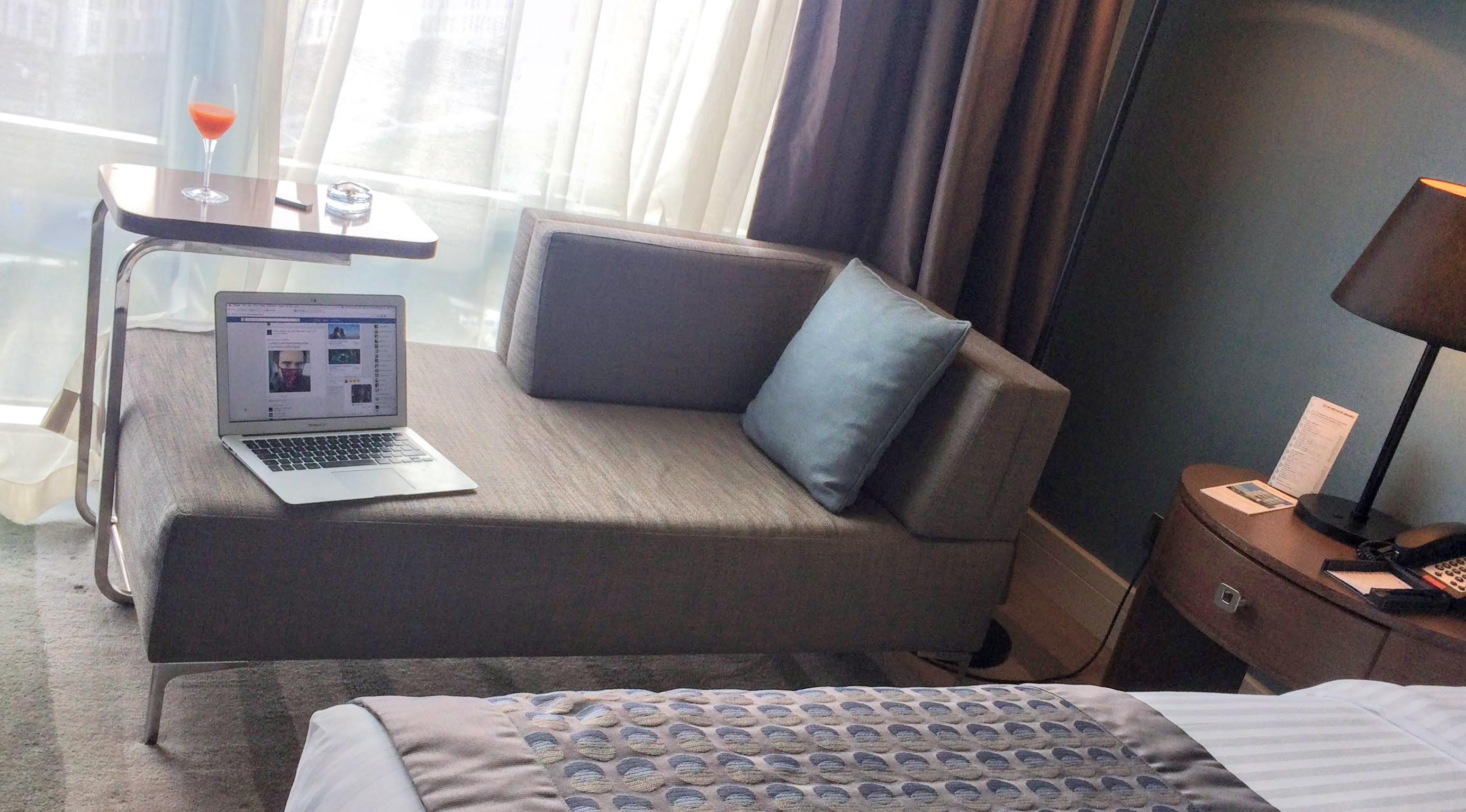
A chaise longue sofa

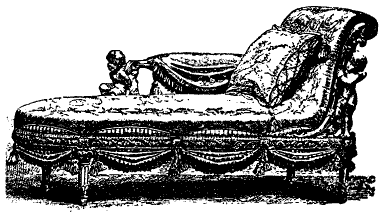
An 18th-century rococo chaise longue

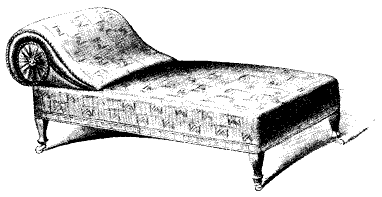
A late 19th-century chaise longue

A chaise longue (/ʃeɪz ˈlɒŋ, tʃeɪz-, -ˈlɒ̃ɡ/; French: [ʃɛz lɔ̃ɡ]; French for 'long chair') is an upholstered sofa in the shape of a chair that is long enough to support the legs of the sitter. For the unupholstered outdoor furniture see sunlounger.

In modern French, the term chaise longue refers to any long sitting chair, such as a deckchair.

In English, the term chaise longue is sometimes written as chaise lounge and pronounced /ˌtʃeɪsˈlaʊndʒ/, a folk etymology replacement of part of the original French term with the unrelated English word lounge. When English speakers imported a new kind of sofa from France in the late 1700s, they transformed the name 'chaise longue' ("long chair") into 'chaise lounge'—since 'lounge' is an English word spelled with the same letters and lounging is something one can do on a "chaise longue." This variant has been documented in British texts since at least 1811 and in American texts since 1824.

== Origins ==
The modern chaise longue was first popularised during the 16th century in France. They were created by French furniture craftsmen for the rich to rest without the need to retire to the bedroom. It was during the Rococo period that the chaise longue became the symbol of social status and only the rarest and most expensive materials were used in their construction. Today, the chaise longue is considered a luxury item for the modern home. They are often used to complement a home's décor, such as living or reading rooms, or as stylish boudoir chairs for bedroom seating.

- Duchesse brisée (French: 'Broken duchess'): this word is used when the chaise longue is divided into two parts: the chair and a long footstool, or two chairs with a stool in between them. The origin of the name is unknown.
- Récamier: a récamier has two raised ends and nothing on the long sides. It is sometimes associated with French Empire (neo-classical) style. It is named after French society hostess Madame Récamier (1777–1849), who posed elegantly on a couch of this kind for a portrait painted in 1800 by Jacques-Louis David. The shape of the récamier is similar to a traditional lit bateau (boat bed) but made for the drawing room, not the bedroom.
- Méridienne: a méridienne has a high headrest and a lower footrest, joined by a sloping piece. Whether or not they have anything at the foot end, méridiennes are asymmetrical daybeds. They were popular in the grand houses of France in the early 19th century. Its name is an old-fashioned word for siesta in French and is based on its typical use: rest in the middle of the day when the sun is near the meridian.
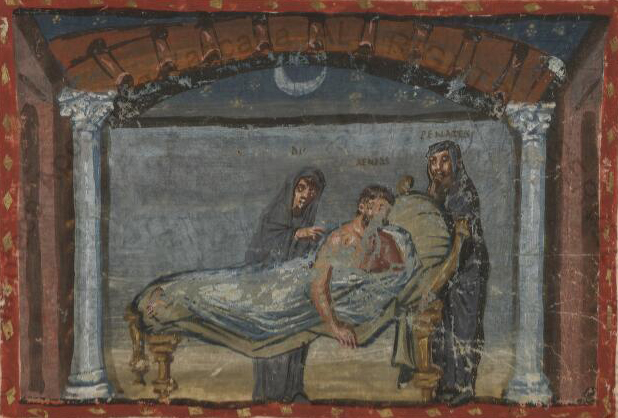
Chaise longue (Klinai) in a 4th-century Roman manuscript

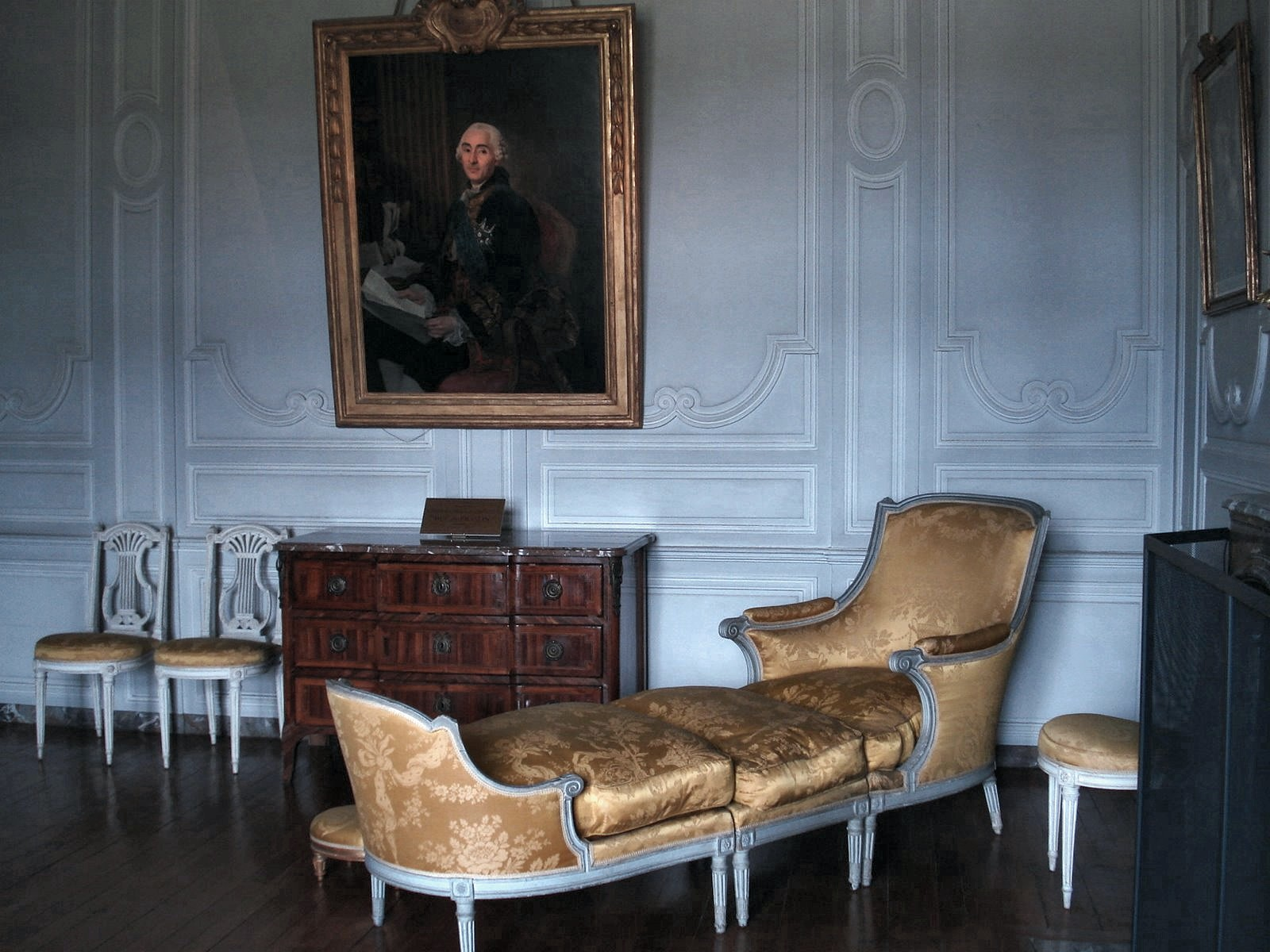
Duchesse brisée

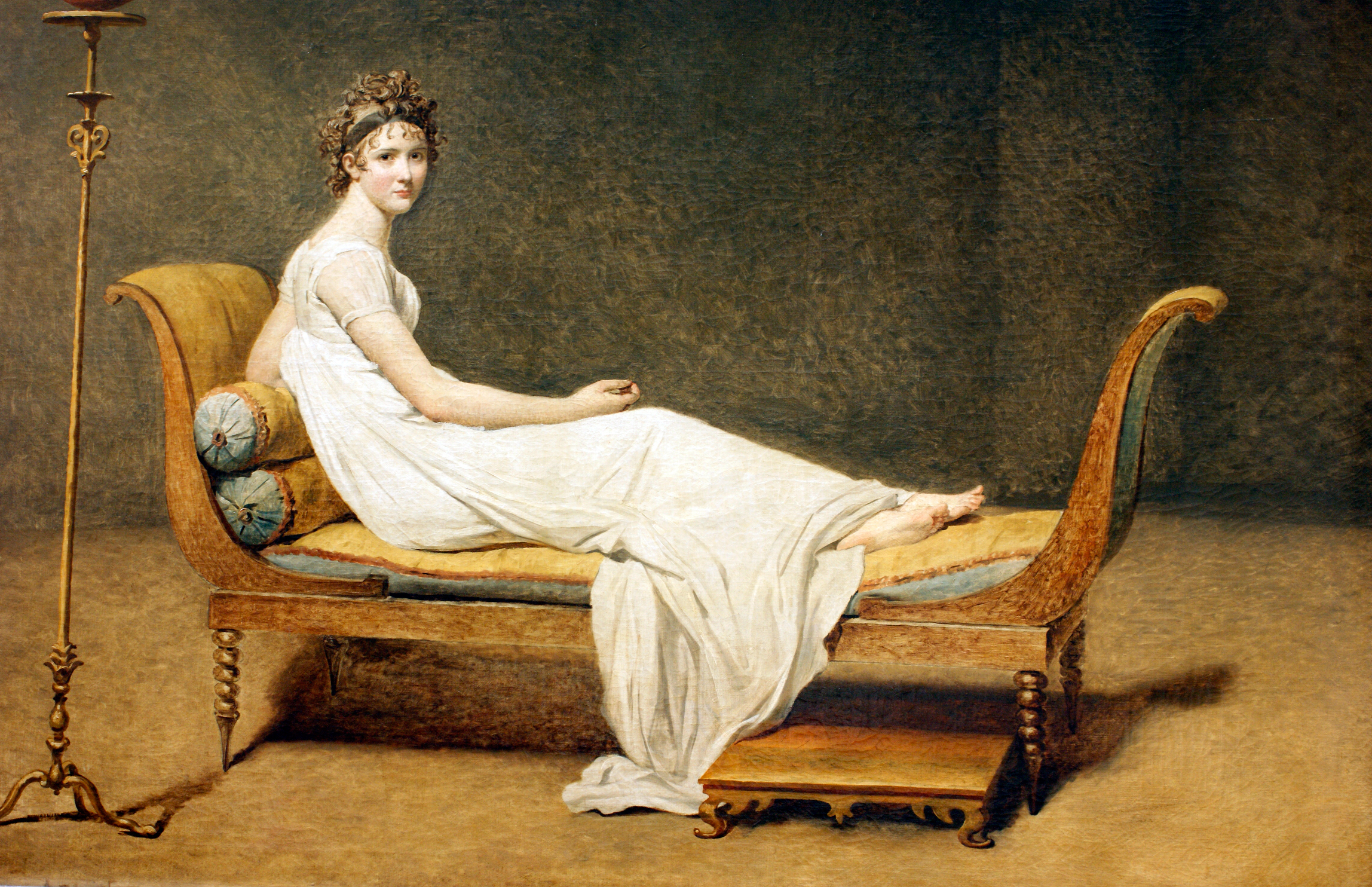
Récamier

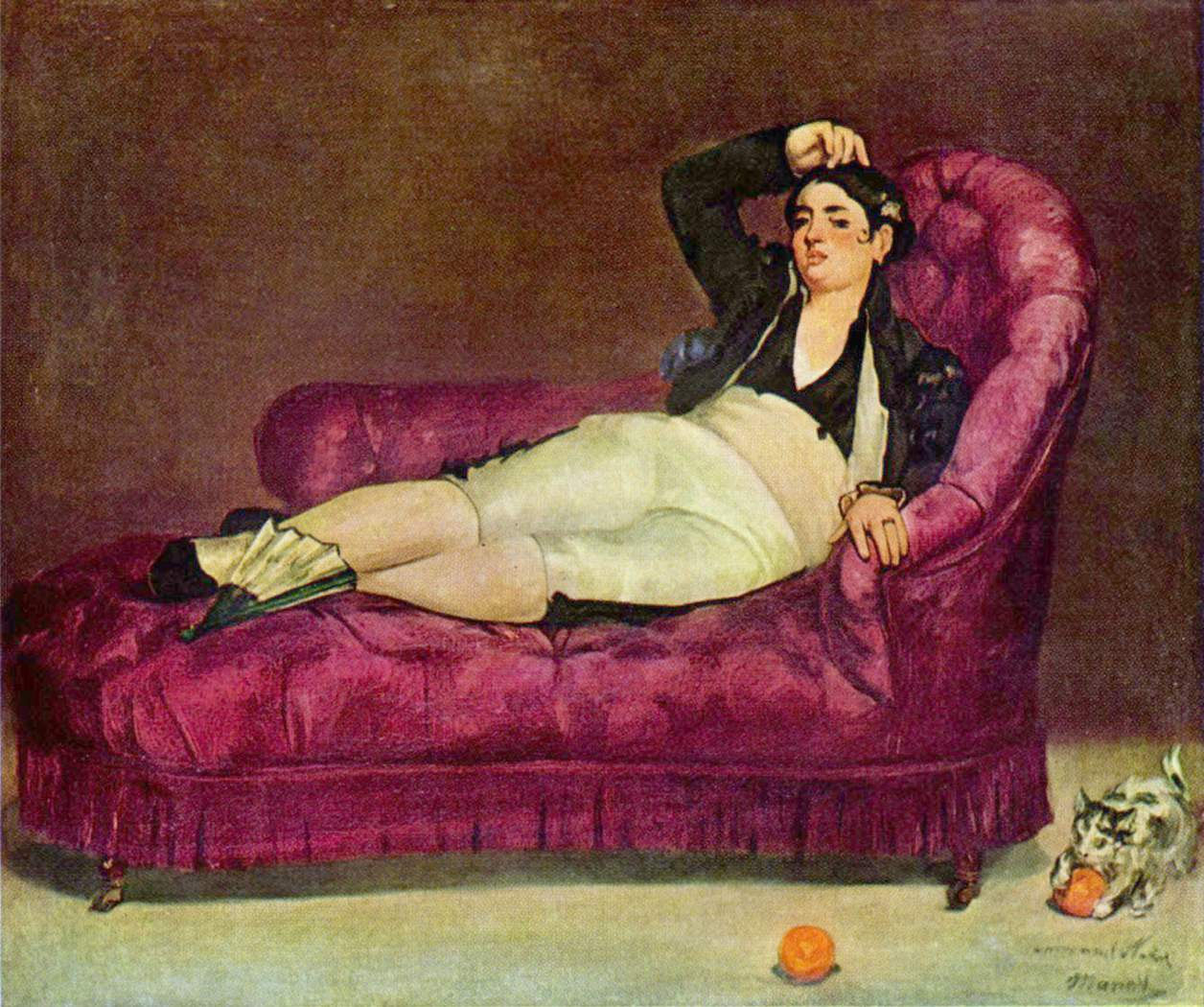
Méridienne

== Psychoanalysis ==
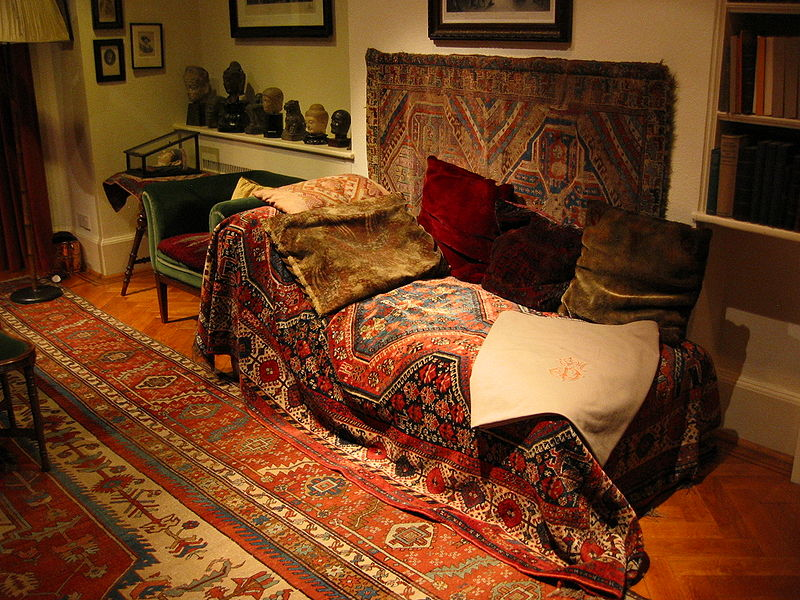
Sigmund Freud's chaise longue at the Freud Museum

The chaise longue has traditionally been associated with psychoanalysis. Sigmund Freud initiated using the chaise longue for this purpose, the idea being that the patient would recline on a couch, with the analyst seated beyond the head of the couch, so that the client would not see the analyst. Reclining and not having to face the analyst was thought to be disinhibiting and encouraging free association. When Freud began to use the chaise longue, Viennese considered it daring to recline on a chaise in the presence of non-intimates. Freud's chaise longue, given to him by a patient, may be seen today at the Freud Museum in London.

Today, psychoanalysts invite clients to recline on couches in their offices during psychotherapy and may use chaises longues rather than more conventional styles of couches out of tradition. The chaise longue is commonly used as visual shorthand to suggest a generic psychotherapist's office in cartoons and other works.

== See also ==
- Couch
- Eames Lounge Chair
- Fainting couch
- Sunlounger
