= United States government operations and exercises on September 11, 2001 =

NORAD operations cancelled in the wake of the 9/11 attacks

On September 11, 2001, the North American Aerospace Defense Command (NORAD) was involved in an ongoing operation which involved deploying fighter aircraft to northeastern North America. The U.S. military and NORAD had also planned to conduct several military exercises and a drill was being held by the National Reconnaissance Office, an agency of the Department of Defense. The operations, exercises and drills were all canceled following the September 11 attacks.

== Ongoing military operations ==
Operation Northern Vigilance was a NORAD operation which involved deploying fighter aircraft to locations in Alaska and Northern Canada. The operation was a response to a Russian exercise, in which long-range bombers were dispatched to Russia's high north. The operation was one part simulation, one part real world. It was immediately called off after NORAD received word from NEADS that the Federal Aviation Administration had evidence of a hijacking. All simulated information (so-called "injects") were purged from computer screens at NORAD headquarters in Colorado. On receiving news of the attacks, the Russians promptly canceled their exercise as well.

== Planned military exercises ==
The military exercises (war games) planned for September 11, 2001, included:

- Global Guardian, an annual command-level exercise organized by United States Strategic Command in cooperation with Space Command and NORAD. Primary purpose is to test and validate nuclear command and control and execution procedures. Global Guardian is performed in conjunction with NORAD's Vigilant Guardian and Amalgam Warrior, as well as exercises sponsored by Air Combat Command (Crown Vigilance) and Space Command (Apollo Guardian).
- Vigilant Guardian, the semiannual NORAD exercise that had been running in conjunction with Global Guardian for several days and which postulated a bomber attack from the former Soviet Union. Vigilant Guardian is a Command Post Exercise (CPX), meaning it is conducted in offices and with computers, but without actual planes in the air. The exercise involves all NORAD command levels. Out of a range of scenarios being run on September 11, 2001, one was a "traditional" simulated hijacking. According to General Eberhart, after the first attack, "it took about 30 seconds" to make the adjustment to the real-world situation. Because of an increased number of staff, the exercise would prove to be an enabler of rapid military response for NORAD and its NEADS component, as senior officials who were manning NORAD command centers throughout the U.S. were available to make rapid decisions.
- Vigilant Warrior. In his book Against All Enemies, Richard Clarke recounts that there was a NORAD exercise ongoing called Vigilant Warrior. The claim is based on a comment that Richard Myers made to Clarke via a video link on September 11, 2001. However, there is no other record of a NORAD exercise named Vigiliant Warrior. Myers was possibly referring to Vigilant Guardian (the aforementioned yearly NORAD exercise held in conjunction with Global Guardian) or Amalgam Warrior (a large-scale, live-fly, CINCNORAD sponsored exercise which is held twice annually). Vigilant Warrior was also a 1994 operation by the US army in the Persian Gulf region, in response to Iraqi troop movements towards Kuwait.

== National Reconnaissance Office drill ==
Aside from military exercises, a National Reconnaissance Office drill was being conducted on September 11, 2001. In a simulated event, a small aircraft would crash into one of the towers of the agency's headquarters after experiencing a mechanical failure. According to its spokesman Art Haubold, "No actual plane was to be involved -- to simulate the damage from the crash, some stairwells and exits were to be closed off, forcing employees to find other ways to evacuate the building.... It was just an incredible coincidence that this happened to involve an aircraft crashing into our facility, as soon as the real world events began, we canceled the exercise." Most of the agency's personnel were sent home after the attacks.

== Operation Tripod bioterrorism exercise ==
On September 12, 2001, there was due to take place the second part of an exercise known as Operation Tripod, set up to "test the plan to distribute antibiotics to the entire city population during a bioterrorism attack". Richard Sheirer, director of the New York City Mayor's Office of Emergency Management (NYC OEM), had hired "over 1,000 Police Academy cadets and Fire Department trainees to play terrified civilians afflicted with various medical conditions, allergies, and panic attacks." Various individuals were invited to watch, including Mayor Rudolph Giuliani, the police and fire commissioners, and representatives of the FBI and the Federal Emergency Management Agency (FEMA). Pier 92 was set up as a model distribution station where the "victims" of the mock attack who needed to receive antibiotics would be treated. The exercise was a follow-up to a previous training exercise in New York, called RED Ex, which took place on May 21, 2001. According to the MTI Report Saving City Lifelines: Lessons Learned in the 9-11 Terrorist Attacks, "September 11 was going to be a busy day at the OEM. Staff members arrived early to prepare for Operation Tripod."

When the September 11, 2001, attacks began, Operation Tripod was immediately canceled as attentions turned to the real ongoing emergency. Because Pier 92 had been set up ready for the exercise, NYC OEM staff were able to move there and quickly convert it into a large emergency operations center when their original command center (in WTC Building 7) was evacuated and later destroyed. Thus, within 31 hours of the attacks, NYC OEM had a functional facility able to manage the search and rescue effort, just four miles north-northwest of the WTC site. The exercise was later rescheduled and took place on May 22, 2002.

== See also ==
- September 11 attacks advance-knowledge conspiracy theories
- 9/11 Commission Report
- Military exercise
- Military simulation
- U.S. military response during the September 11 attacks
