= 9/11 advance-knowledge conspiracy theories =

Various conspiracy theories allege that certain institutions or individuals had foreknowledge of the September 11 attacks in the United States in 2001. Some of the primary debates include whether the Bush administration or the United States Armed Forces had awareness of the planned attack methods, the precise volume of intelligence that American agencies had regarding al-Qaeda activities inside the United States, whether the put options placed on United Airlines and American Airlines and other trades indicated foreknowledge, and why the identities of the traders have never been made public.

Additional facets of the theories include debate as to whether warnings received from foreign agencies were specific enough to have warranted preventive action, whether domestic intelligence about planned al-Qaeda attacks was thorough enough to have mandated intervention, the extent to which the alleged hijackers were under surveillance prior to the attacks, and whether other foreign intelligence agencies were aware of an imminent attack.

== Using planes as missiles ==
Immediately following the attacks, President George W. Bush stated that: "Nobody in our government, at least, and I don't think the prior government, could envision flying airplanes into buildings", and National Security Advisor Condoleezza Rice claimed: "no one could have predicted that they would try to use an airplane as a missile". An Air Force general called the attack: "something we had never seen before, something we had never even thought of." A few days after the attacks, FBI Director Robert Mueller announced: "There were no warning signs that I'm aware of that would indicate this type of operation in the country." However, Mueller noted that an FBI agent in Minneapolis said Moussaoui might be that type of person that could fly something into the World Trade Center. Mueller said this warning should have been followed more vigorously.

Some mainstream media reports have conflicted with these statements, claiming that the FBI, CIA and Executive Branch knew of the threat of planes being used as missiles as early as 1995, following the foiling of the Bojinka plot. In September 2002, one year after the 9/11 attacks, The Chicago Sun-Times reported that:

The FBI had advance indications of plans to hijack U.S. airliners and use them as weapons, but neither acted on them nor distributed the intelligence to local police agencies. From the moment of the September 11 attacks, all high-ranking federal officials insisted that the terrorists' method of operation surprised them. Many continue to stick to that story. Actually, elements of the suicide hijacking plan were known to the FBI as early as 1995 and, if coupled with current information, might have uncovered the plot.

The Pentagon Mass Casualty project (codenamed Pentagon Mascal) was a contingency exercise that was held in the Office of the Secretary of Defense conference room between October 24 and 26, 2000. The exercise required emergency response teams, members of the defense protective services, and U.S. government officials to conduct emergency simulations in preparation for a possible plane crash into the Pentagon.

The book The Terror Timeline includes numerous articles that are often cited to suggest that the method of flying planes into buildings was known by U.S. officials:

- In 1994, there were three examples of failed attempts to deliberately crash planes into buildings, including one where a lone pilot crashed a small plane into the lawn of the White House. That specific incident coincidentally also happened on September 11, exactly 7 years before the 9/11 attacks.
- The Bojinka plot was a foiled large-scale al-Qaeda terrorist attack to blow up eleven airliners and their passengers as they flew from Asia to America, due to take place in January 1995.
- The 2000 edition of the FAA's annual report on Criminal Acts Against Aviation said that although Osama bin Laden 'is not known to have attacked civil aviation, he has both the motivation and the wherewithal to do so,' adding, 'Bin Laden's anti-Western and anti-American attitudes make him and his followers a significant threat to civil aviation, particularly to U.S. civil aviation.'"
- In April 2001, NORAD ran a war game in which the Pentagon was to become incapacitated; a NORAD planner proposed the simulated crash of a hijacked foreign commercial airliner into the Pentagon, but the Joints Chiefs of Staff rejected that scenario as "too unrealistic"
- In July 2001 at the G8 summit in Genoa, anti-aircraft missile batteries were installed following a report that terrorists would try to crash a plane to kill George Bush and other world leaders.
- On the morning of September 11, 2001, the National Reconnaissance Office, which is responsible for operating U.S. reconnaissance satellites, had scheduled an exercise simulating the crashing of an aircraft into their building, 4 miles (6 km) from Washington Dulles International Airport.

A 2004 USA Today article, "NORAD had drills of jets as weapons," describes pre-9/11 NORAD drills that suggest they were prepared for such an attack as happened on 9/11:

In the two years before the September 11 attacks, the North American Aerospace Defense Command conducted exercises simulating what the White House says was unimaginable at the time: hijacked airliners used as weapons to crash into targets and cause mass casualties. One of the imagined targets was the World Trade Center. In another exercise, jets performed a mock shootdown over the Atlantic Ocean of a jet supposedly laden with chemical poisons headed toward a target in the United States. In a third scenario, the target was the Pentagon – but that drill was not run after Defense officials said it was unrealistic.

That NORAD was aware of the threat of terrorists hijacking commercial airliners within the United States, and using them as guided missiles, was flatly denied by the 9/11 Commission, which asserted several times in their report that "The threat of terrorists hijacking commercial airliners within the United States – and using them as guided missiles – was not recognized by NORAD before 9/11."

The September 11 attacks in 2001 occurred during that year's Global Guardian and Vigilant Guardian joint exercises. That year, according to the 9/11 Commission Report, Vigilant Guardian 'postulated a bomber attack from the former Soviet Union' on North America. In contrast to the 9/11 Commission Report – Michael Ruppert has characterized Vigilant Guardian as "a hijacking drill, not a cold war exercise". He cites direct quotes from participants which indicate "that the drill involved hijacked airliners rather than Russian Bombers". General Arnold, Tech. Sgt. W. Powel and Lt. Col. Dwane Deskins have stated that when they first were informed about hijacked airliners they thought it was "part of the exercise".

The Joint Inquiry of 2002 confirmed that the Intelligence Community had received at least twelve reports over a seven-year period suggesting that terrorists might use planes as weapons. After briefly discussing each of them, it says that "The CIA disseminated several of these reports to the FBI and to agencies responsible for preventive actions. They included the FAA... Despite these reports, the Intelligence Community did not produce any assessments of the likelihood that terrorists would use planes as weapons, and U.S. policymakers apparently remained unaware of this kind of potential threat." Former National Security Advisor Sandy Berger testified to the Joint Inquiry:

We heard of the idea of planes as weapons, but I don't recall being presented with any specific threat information about an attack of this nature, or highlighting this threat, or indicating it was more likely than any other

By September 2001, a part of the Pentagon Renovation Program was completed: blast windows and wall reinforcing system, to significantly diminish the Defense Department headquarters' vulnerability to blast damage from a terrorist attack.

== Insider trading ==
The Times reported on September 18 that investigations were underway into the unusually large numbers of shares in insurance companies and airlines sold off before the attack in the UK, Italy, Germany, Japan, Switzerland, France, and the US. News accounts in the weeks that followed reported a notable pattern of trading in the options of United and American Airlines, as well as Morgan Stanley and other market activity. An article published in The Journal of Business in 2006 provides statistical evidence of unusual put option market activity days before 9/11:

Examination of the option trading leading up to September 11 reveals that there was an unusually high level of put buying. This finding is consistent with informed investors having traded options before the attacks.

In a statement to the 9/11 Commission in 2003, Mindy Kleinberg, of the 9/11 Family Steering Committee, said:

Never before on the Chicago Exchange were such large amounts of United and American Airlines options traded. These investors netted a profit of at least $5 million after the September 11 attacks. Interestingly, the names of the investors remain undisclosed and the $5 million remains unclaimed in the Chicago Exchange account.

The 9/11 Commission Report concluded that "Exhaustive investigations by the Securities and Exchange Commission, FBI, and other agencies have uncovered no evidence that anyone with advance knowledge of the attacks profited through securities transactions." The report further stated:

Highly publicized allegations of insider trading in advance of 9/11 generally rest on reports of unusual pre-9/11 trading activity in companies whose stock plummeted after the attacks. Some unusual trading did in fact occur, but each such trade proved to have an innocuous explanation. For example, the volume of put options — investments that pay off only when a stock drops in price — surged in the parent companies of United Airlines on September 6 and American Airlines on September 10 — highly suspicious trading on its face. Yet, further investigation has revealed that the trading had no connection with 9/11. A single U.S.-based institutional investor with no conceivable ties to al Qaeda purchased 95 percent of the UAL puts on September 6 as part of a trading strategy that also included buying 115,000 shares of American on September 10. Similarly, much of the seemingly suspicious trading in American on September 10 was traced to a specific U.S.-based options trading newsletter, faxed to its subscribers on Sunday, September 9, which recommended these trades. These examples typify the evidence examined by the investigation. The SEC and the FBI, aided by other agencies and the securities industry, devoted enormous resources to investigating this issue, including securing the cooperation of many foreign governments. These investigators have found that the apparently suspicious consistently proved innocuous.

=== WTC hard drive restoration operation ===
In December 2001 and early 2002, there was extensive media coverage of the efforts by the German data retrieval company Convar to reconstruct, using laser scanning technology, data from damaged hard drives recovered from the WTC as part of the investigation into a surge in financial transactions just before the two hijacked planes crashed into New York's World Trade Center. The company's CEO, Peter Henschel, noting that the investigation was being conducted for a number of U.S.-based clients cooperating with the FBI, said that there was suspicion that criminals had used inside knowledge about the attacks to make and authorize financial transactions during the chaos. According to Convar's data retrieval expert Richard Wagner, criminal transactions in excess of 100 million dollars could have been made in the hope that their trail would have disappeared as a result of the destruction of the WTC mainframe computers. As reported by the Heute Journal, a news programme by the German ZDF TV channel, by March 2002 Convar had been able to restore several hundred hard drives from the WTC.

However, the 9/11 Commission, in a memorandum entitled "FBI Briefing on Trading" dated October 18, 2003, said that when asked about the media coverage of the hard drive restoration operation, the "assembled [FBI] agents expressed no knowledge of the reported hard-drive recovery effort", further noting that one New York agent argued that it was "extremely unlikely that any hard-drives survived to the extent that they data [sic] be recovered."

=== Later research ===
The papers of several finance researchers also suggest that some profited from foreknowledge of 9/11. In 2006, Allen Poteshman, a professor of Finance from the University of Illinois, published an analysis of the airline stock option trades preceding the attacks. This peer-reviewed study, published by the University of Chicago Press, came to the conclusion that an indicator of long put volume was "unusually high which is consistent with informed investors having traded in the option market in advance of the attacks". In January 2010, a team of Swiss financial experts published evidence for at least thirteen informed trades in which the investors had apparent foreknowledge of the attacks. Finally, in April 2010, an international team of experts showed that there was a significant abnormal increase in trading volume in the option market just before the 9/11 attacks in contrast to the absence of abnormal trading volume over periods long before the attacks, concluding that their findings were "consistent with insiders anticipating the 9-11 attacks".

== Intelligence warnings ==
The 9/11 Commission Report states that "the 9/11 attacks were a shock, but they should not have come as a surprise. Islamic extremists had given plenty of warnings that they meant to kill Americans indiscriminately and in large numbers." The report continued:

During the spring and summer of 2001, U.S. intelligence agencies received a stream of warnings about an attack al-Qaeda planned, as one report puts it "something very, very, very big." Director of Central Intelligence George Tenet told us "the system was blinking red."

The US administration, CIA and FBI received multiple prior warnings from foreign governments and intelligence services, including France, Germany, the UK, Israel, Jordan, Afghanistan, Egypt, Algeria and Russia. The warnings varied in their level of detail, but all stated that they believed an al-Qaeda attack inside the United States was imminent. British Member of Parliament Michael Meacher cites these warnings, suggesting that some of them must have been deliberately ignored. Some of these warnings include the following:

- March 2001 – Italian intelligence warns of an al-Qaeda plot in the United States involving a massive strike involving aircraft, based on their wiretap of an al-Qaeda cell in Milan.
- July 2001 – Jordanian intelligence told US officials that al-Qaeda was planning an attack on American soil, and Egyptian intelligence warned the CIA that 20 al-Qaeda Jihadists were in the United States, and that four of them were receiving flight training.
- July 26, 2001 – CBS News reports that Attorney General John Ashcroft has stopped flying commercial airlines due to a threat assessment.
- August 2001 – The Israeli Mossad gives the CIA a list of 19 terrorists living in the US and says that they appear to be planning to carry out an attack in the near future. At least four of those named would hijack airplanes on 9/11.
- August 2001 – The United Kingdom is warned three times of an imminent al-Qaeda attack in the United States, the third specifying multiple airplane hijackings. According to the Sunday Herald, the report is passed on to President Bush a short time later.
- September 2001 – Egyptian intelligence warns American officials that al-Qaeda is in the advanced stages of executing a significant operation against an American target, probably within the US.
- On September 6, General Toufik, head of the Algerian DRS, based on HUMINT intelligence gathered by his infiltration cells in Afghanistan, clearly informed CIA Director George Tenet of the imminent attack. Tenet mentions this in his book.
- September 10, 2001 – US Generals warned not to fly on morning of 9/11.

=== Foreign government foreknowledge ===
It has been suggested that some foreign governments and intelligence agencies may have had some foreknowledge of the attacks.

==== Iran ====
Sibel Edmonds, an FBI translator hired after 9/11, was told by another translator that the FBI received information in April 2001, from a reliable Iranian intelligence asset, that Osama Bin Laden was planning attacks on 4–5 cities with planes, and that some of the plotters were already in the country and the attacks would happen in a few months. The translator described the interviewing agents' reaction that the warnings were not specific enough to act upon.

In 2004, the 9/11 Commission "found no evidence that Iran or Hezbollah was aware of the planning for what later became the 9/11 attack." Just before their report was published the committee received evidence which caused to add to the report that the topic required further investigation.

On December 22, 2010, a United States Federal Judge signed a default judgment holding Iran, the Taliban and al-Qaeda liable following an open court hearing in which the evidence was produced by the plaintiffs' attorneys which they said showed that Iran assisted the hijackers. 9/11 Commission members and witnesses who claimed they were Iranian defectors and members of Ministry of Intelligence and National Security and the Iranian Revolutionary Guards also testified during the hearing. The suit Havlish, et al. v. bin Laden, et al. was brought in 2001 by Fiona Havlish whose husband died in the North Tower. Abolghasem Mesbahi, who claimed he was a former Ministry of Intelligence operative in charge of Iran's espionage operations in Western Europe testified that he was part of a task force that designed contingency plans for unconventional warfare against the United States code-named Shaitan dar Atash/Satan in Flames which included crashing hijacked passenger airliners into the World Trade Center, the Pentagon, and the White House, and that in the summer of 2001 he received three coded messages telling him to activate the plan. An Iranian government memorandum was presented as evidence that Iran's Supreme Leader Ayatollah Khamenei had pre-knowledge of the attacks. Several days after the ruling a spokesperson for Iran's Foreign ministry said charges that Iran "had a hand in planning the attacks and that one of al-Qaeda's members was present inside the country is baseless," and said "With the repetition of such claims to back its political aims the U.S. is putting the peace and security of the world in jeopardy".

In February 2012, President Obama's Director of National Intelligence James Clapper testified before the Senate Armed Services Committee that "Iran has harbored al-Qaida leaders, facilitators," and that they have been "under house arrest conditions. (Iran's rulers) have had this sort of standoff arrangement with al-Qaida, allowing (al-Qaida) to exist (inside Iran), but not to foment any operations directly from Iran, because they're very sensitive about, 'Hey, we might come after them there as well.'... So there has been this longstanding, as I say, kind of, shotgun marriage, or marriage of convenience".

==== Israel ====
Israeli Prime Minister Benjamin Netanyahu said that he had predicted the September 11 terrorist attacks in his 1995 book Fighting Terrorism: How Democracies Can Defeat Domestic and International Terrorism, in which he suggested that radical Islamists might plant a nuclear bomb in the basement of the World Trade Center. However, American writer Daniel Pipes criticized his claim, stating that a nuclear attack would have annihilated a large section of the city, not just the Twin Towers, which is not what happened in reality. Pipes concluded that claims by Netanyahu regarding a prediction of "militant Islam bringing down the World Trade Center" are unfounded.

The LA Times reported that the Mossad informed the Federal Bureau of Investigation (FBI) and Central Intelligence Agency (CIA) in August 2001 that as many as 200 terrorists were slipping into the United States and planning "a major assault on the United States." The Israeli intelligence agency allegedly cautioned the FBI that it had picked up indications of a "large-scale target" in the United States and that Americans would be "very vulnerable".

In March 2001, the US Office of the National Counterintelligence Executive had issued a warning about people identifying themselves as "Israeli art students" attempting to bypass security and gain entry to federal buildings, and even to the private residences of senior federal officials. A French intelligence agency later noted "according to the FBI, Arab terrorists and suspected terror cells lived in Phoenix, Arizona, as well as in Miami and Hollywood, Florida, from December 2000 to April 2001 in direct proximity to the Israeli spy cells". The report contended that Mossad agents were spying on Mohammed Atta and Marwan al-Shehi, two leaders of the 9/11 hijack teams. In 2002, several officials dismissed reports of a spy ring and said the allegations were made by a Drug Enforcement Administration agent who was angry that his theories had been dismissed.

Iranian president Mahmoud Ahmadinejad said in an August 2010 speech that no "Zionists" were killed in the attacks since, according to him, "one day earlier they were told not go to their workplace." He also remarked, "What was the story of September 11? During five to six days, and with the aid of the media, they created and prepared public opinion so that everyone considered an attack on Afghanistan and Iraq". However, the number of Jews who died in the attacks is variously estimated at between 270 and 400, while several Israelis died in the attack as well.

On September 14, 2001, The New York Times and Israeli newspaper Haaretz reported that four hours after the attack, the FBI arrested five Israelis who had been filming the smoking skyline from the roof of a white van in the parking lot of an apartment building; a headline given by Haaretz observed that they had been described as displaying "puzzling behavior". Police found the van and a search revealed $4,700 in cash hidden, along with foreign passports and a boxcutter which aroused suspicions and led to the detention of the occupants.

ABC News investigative reporter John Miller, in a report aired 21 June 2002, spoke to the witness who reported it to the police. She was watching the twin towers burning from her apartment in New Jersey, when she noticed three men on top of a van, posing for pictures, with the towers burning in the background. She said: "I could see that they were happy, they didn't look shocked to me, I thought it was very strange." In a check of National Security Agency databases, some of the men "were listed as having had connections to Israeli intelligence." The FBI report includes an interview of a woman who stated that "all of the males appeared to be jovial in that they smiled, hugged one another, and gave 'high fives'." This description led the incident to become known as the "dancing Israelis" in conspiracy theory circles.

The men were charged with illegally residing in the United States and working in it without permits and were held in detention, during which time they were interrogated and given polygraph tests before being deported back to Israel. Back home, several of the men appeared on an Israeli TV chat show, where one of them, Oded Ellner, subsequently stated that "The fact of the matter is we are coming from a country that experiences terror daily. Our purpose was to document the event". The five men worked at Urban Moving Systems Inc., which was owned and operated by Dominik Suter. After the men were arrested, the FBI searched their offices and questioned Suter; however, Suter is reported as having fled to Israel before he could be questioned further. His name subsequently appeared on the May 2002 FBI Suspect List along with the Sep 11 hijackers and other suspected extremists. One of Urban's employees later told the FBI that, after being aware of the attack, she heard one of the detainees state: "Now you see what they are capable of doing. The US will have to get involved now."

==== France ====
On December 5, 2007, French authorities filed preliminary charges against Guillaume Dasquié, a reporter for the daily Le Monde, for publishing state secrets related to the 9/11 hijackings. Dasquié's April 16 article in Le Monde, titled "September 11: the French had long known" reported that the General Directorate of External Security (DGSE), had warned the U.S. of a possible terrorist plot that involved al-Qaeda hijacking planes and crashing them into buildings some eight months before 9/11. The article contained excerpts from a 328-page classified DGSE report on al-Qaeda activities which included maps, analyses, graphics, and satellite photos.

==== Afghanistan ====
Moderate elements of the Taliban are reported to have given the United States advance warning of the attacks. The BBC reports that Wakil Ahmed Muttawakil, the Taliban's Foreign Minister, sent the US an advance warning of the attack following a tip-off he received from Tohir Yo'ldosh, the leader of the Islamic Movement of Uzbekistan. Like al-Qaeda, the Taliban allowed the Islamic Movement of Uzbekistan to place training camps in Afghanistan. Tohir Yo'ldosh was reported to have been concerned, correctly, as it turned out, that if al-Qaeda was not stopped prior to launching the attacks, the US would retaliate against all of Afghanistan, which would have a negative effect on his movement's efforts.

== Able Danger ==
A classified military intelligence program known as "Able Danger" was created in October 1999 specifically targeting al-Qaeda. Lt. Col. Anthony Shaffer and Congressman Curt Weldon (R-PA) charged before the Senate Judiciary Committee that Able Danger had identified Mohamed Atta, and three of the other hijackers, prior to 9/11.

The existence of Able Danger, and its purported early identification of the 9/11 terrorists, was first disclosed publicly on June 19, 2005. On June 27, 2005, Weldon stated to the House:

Mr. Speaker, I rise because information has come to my attention over the past several months that is very disturbing. I have learned that, in fact, one of our Federal agencies had, in fact, identified the major New York cell of Mohamed Atta prior to 9/11; and I have learned, Mr. Speaker, that in September 2000, that Federal agency actually was prepared to bring the FBI in and prepared to work with the FBI to take down the cell that Mohamed Atta was involved in in New York City, along with two of the other terrorists. I have also learned, Mr. Speaker, that when that recommendation was discussed within that Federal agency, the lawyers in the administration at that time said, you cannot pursue contact with the FBI against that cell. Mohamed Atta is in the U.S. on a green card, and we are fearful of the fallout from the Waco incident. So we did not allow that Federal agency to proceed.

There is no mention of Able Danger in the 9/11 Commission Report. Two 9/11 Commission members, Timothy J. Roemer and John F. Lehman, both claimed not to have received any information on Able Danger. Weldon alleged that intelligence concerning Able Danger was provided to the 9/11 Commission but was ignored.

Following coverage in the national media of Weldon's claims in August 2005, Thomas Kean and Lee H. Hamilton, former Chair and Vice Chair of the 9/11 Commission, issued a statement in which they stated the Commission had been aware of the Able Danger program, and requested and obtained information about it from the Department of Defense (DoD), but none of the information provided had indicated the program had identified Atta or other 9/11 hijackers.

Curt Weldon issued a response to this statement clarifying the mission of Able Danger, expressing concern over the statements made by various members of the 9/11 Commission, and promising to push forward until it is understood why the DoD was unable to pass the information uncovered by Able Danger to the FBI, and why the 9/11 Commission failed to follow up on the information they were given on Able Danger.

== Al-Qaeda investigations ==
In 2002, FBI agent Coleen Rowley wrote to FBI director Robert Mueller describing her experience working with Minneapolis FBI agents tracking suspected terrorist Zacarias Moussaoui prior to the attacks. She describes how FBI HQ personnel in Washington, D.C. had mishandled and failed to take action on information provided by the Minneapolis Field Office, and had failed to issue a warrant to search Moussaui's computer despite having probable cause. Senator Chuck Grassley later wrote that "If the application for the FISA warrant had gone forward, agents would have found information in Moussaoui's belongings that linked him ... to a major financier of the hijacking plot". Rowley was credited as a whistleblower and jointly awarded the TIME Magazine "Person of the Year" for 2002.

In May, Rowley testified to the Senate and the 9/11 Commission about the FBI's pre-9/11 lapses due to its internal organization and mishandling of information related to the attacks. Mueller and Grassley pushed for and achieved a major reorganization, focused on creation of the new Office of Intelligence at the FBI.

FBI agent and al-Qaeda expert John P. O'Neill warned of an al-Qaeda threat to the United States in 2000. He retired from his position in mid-2001, citing repeated blocking of his investigations of al-Qaeda by FBI officials. After his retirement from the FBI, the World Trade Center hired him as its chief of security. He started work on August 23, 2001; 9/11 rescue workers found his body in a staircase inside the south tower rubble.

FBI agent Robert Wright accused the agency of shutting down his investigation into alleged terrorist-training camps in Chicago and Kansas City in 1998 and described them as "having failed to take seriously the threat of terrorism in the U.S.".

According to Senator Bob Graham, who was chairman of the Senate Intelligence Committee from June 2001 through the buildup to the Iraq war, "Two of the September 11, 2001, hijackers had a support network in the United States that included agents of the Saudi government, and the Bush administration and FBI blocked a congressional investigation into that relationship," as reported by the Miami Herald. And in Graham's book, Intelligence Matters, he makes clear that some details of that financial support from Saudi Arabia were in the 27 pages of the congressional inquiry's final report that were blocked from release by the administration, despite the pleas of leaders of both parties on the House and Senate intelligence committees." In March 2012, as part of a lawsuit by 9/11 victims' families, Graham and another former U.S. Senator Bob Kerrey said in affidavits that they were certain there were direct links between the Saudi government and the attacks.

There have also been allegations that the hijackers' preparations may have been given assistance by U.S. intelligence. According to CBS News, "two of the Sept. 11 hijackers who lived in San Diego in 2000 rented a room from a man who reportedly worked as an undercover FBI informant... the FBI informant prayed with them and even helped one open a bank account." Doubts have been raised about the speed with which the hijackers were identified, leading to suggestions that the FBI already had the names of the hijackers in advance. In his book Against All Enemies, Richard Clarke said that around 9:59 am on September 11, which is the time when WTC2 collapsed, that Al-Qaeda members had been identified on flight manifests A former high-level intelligence official said that "Whatever trail was left was left deliberately—for the F.B.I. to chase."

== Possible warnings given to individuals ==
- It is often alleged that San Francisco Mayor, Willie Lewis Brown, Jr. canceled his flight plans for September 11 after receiving a warning late on September 10 from what he described as his airport security. Brown said, "they always alert me when I ought to be careful", and he decided to fly anyway. In September 2006, Willie Brown responded to these escalating conspiracy rumors by calling them an "ongoing myth".
- Odigo Messenger reported that two of their employees who were working in an Odigo office in Herzliya Pituah in Israel, received a derogatory English electronic instant message, on the day of the attack, non-specifically threatening them that a terrorist attack would happen. They did not mention this to their employer until after they heard reports of a terrorist attack in America on the news, after which they informed the company's management, who traced the IP and contacted the FBI. However, the threatening message did not mention the location of an attack. The notes ended with an anti-Semitic slur. Odigo Vice President of Sales and Marketing Alex Diamandis later said that the message did not identify the United States or the World Trade Center as to be involved in the event, and that "it could easily be coincidence."
- Silverstein Properties, according to the New York Times, had planned to meet on September 11 on the 88th floor of one of the towers to "discuss what to do in the event of a terrorist attack", but canceled the meeting late on September 10 "because one participant could not attend."
- Susan Lindauer asserts that she and other intelligence colleagues were aware of the attacks in April 2001, and that Richard Carl Fuisz had advised in August 2001 against traveling to New York.
- Parke Godfrey, a professor of computer science at York University in Toronto, Ontario testified in United States v. Susan Lindauer that he had been warned by Lindauer on several occasions of a "massive" attack on southern Manhattan that would involve planes and the possibility of a thermonuclear weapon.
- On September 6, 2001, a freshman from a class of Pakistani immigrants at New Utrecht High School in Bensonhurst, Brooklyn, was overheard by his English teacher, Antoinette DiLorenzo, to say that the two World Trade Center towers "won't be standing there next week." After DiLorenzo reported the incident on September 13, the youth and his older brother were questioned by the FBI and local police. According to police, the youth admitted to making the comment but he and his brother said he had been kidding.
- Kurt Sonnenfeld, a former videographer for the Federal Emergency Management Agency (FEMA) who documented the aftermath of the attacks at the World Trade Center complex, claims that he has videotapes proving that U.S. government officials had prior knowledge of the 9/11 attacks. Sonnenfeld is currently living in Argentina, where Denver police are seeking his extradition on charges of murdering his wife.

== See also ==
- Antisemitic conspiracy theories
- Islamophobic tropes
- Pearl Harbor advance-knowledge conspiracy theory
- Federal Express Flight 705 – 1994 cockpit attack
- Southwest Airlines Flight 1763 – August 2000 cockpit attack
- Debt of Honor – 1994 Tom Clancy novel where a 747 is crashed into the US Capitol
- Executive Decision – 1996 Kurt Russell movie where a 747 is used as a weapon targeting Washington, DC
- Operation Bojinka – plot by Ramzi Yousef and Khalid Shaikh Mohammed, foiled in 1995, to attack multiple airliners and crash a plane into the CIA
- Escape from New York – 1981 John Carpenter movie starring Kurt Russell, where Air Force One is hijacked by terrorists and flown into a skyscraper very close to the World Trade Center.
- The Lone Gunmen – 2001 The X-Files spin-off, where in the pilot episode an airliner departing Boston is hijacked, with plans to crash it into the World Trade Center.
- Party Music – 2001 album by The Coup, whose originally intended cover art, created in June 2001, showed the destruction of the World Trade Center
