= Sonnenfeld =

Sonnenfeld may refer to:

== People ==
- Sonnenfeld (surname), a list of people with the surname

== Places ==
- Cieszęta (German: Sonnenfeld), a village in northern Poland
- Colonia Sonnenfeld (now Aldea San Gregorio), Villaguay Department, Entre Ríos, Argentina
- Sonnenfeld colony, a settlement near the hamlet of Oungre, Saskatchewan, Canada

== Other uses ==
- the title family in Familie Sonnenfeld, a German television series

== See also ==
- Sommerfeld (disambiguation)
- Sonnefeld
- Sonneveld
- Sonnenfeldt
- Zonnenfeld
