= Vigilant Guardian =

Vigilant Guardian may refer to:

- Operation Vigilant Guardian, an operation of the Belgian army in 2015
- Global Guardian, an annual training exercise sponsored by the United States Strategic Command with Air Force Space Command and NORAD
