= U.S. military response during the September 11 attacks =

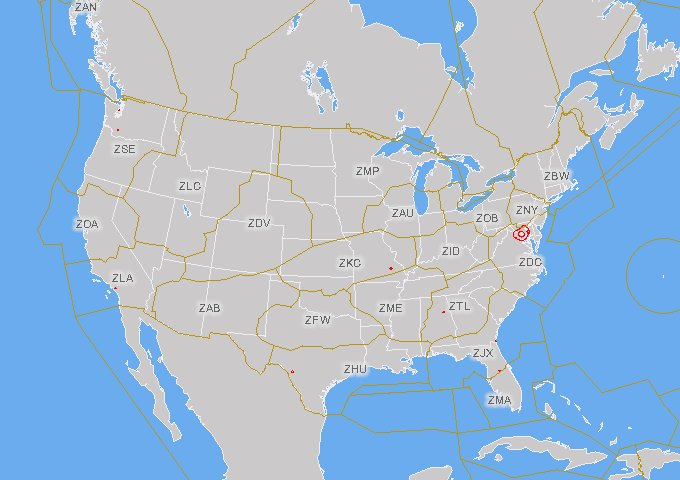
This temporary flight restriction map from the Federal Aviation Administration shows the boundaries of the regions controlled by the Area Control Centers within and adjoining the contiguous United States, as well as the FAA location identifier of each such Center operated by the United States.

On the morning of Tuesday, September 11, 2001, Islamist militant organization al-Qaeda, led by Osama bin Laden, hijacked four commercial airliners in the United States and tried to crash them into large buildings, succeeding in three cases. American Airlines Flight 11, having departed from Logan International Airport in Boston, was flown into the North Tower of the World Trade Center at 08:46. United Airlines Flight 175, also leaving from Boston, struck the South Tower at 09:03. American Airlines Flight 77, from Dulles International Airport, hit the Pentagon at 09:37. United Airlines Flight 93, from Newark International Airport, was crashed near Shanksville, Pennsylvania, at 10:03, after the passengers on board revolted.

Standing orders on September 11 dictated that, on receiving a request for help from the Federal Aviation Administration (FAA), the North American Aerospace Defense Command (NORAD) would normally order escort aircraft to approach and follow an aircraft that was confirmed to be hijacked in order to ensure positive flight following, report unusual observations, and help in search and rescue in an emergency. The 9/11 Commission determined that, on the morning of September 11, the FAA had not notified NORAD of the hijackings of Flights 11, 77, 93, and 175 in time for escort aircraft to reach the hijacked flights. Notification of the hijacking of Flight 11 prompted the scrambling of two fighter jets from Otis Air National Guard Base, but they were not in the air until after Flight 11 had hit the North Tower. An erroneous FAA report of a hijacked plane heading towards Washington ("phantom Flight 11") prompted the scrambling of three fighters from the 1st Fighter Wing at Langley Air Force Base, which, because of "poor communications", flew east, out to sea, not toward Washington, significantly delaying their arrival on the scene.

== Radar tracking ==
On taking control of the airliners, the hijackers of the four planes switched off the transponders or changed their codes, making it difficult to track them on radar. Northeast Air Defense Sector (NEADS) / NORAD personnel stated they had trouble identifying and tracking the aircraft, succeeding only sometimes:

- NEADS technicians spotted Flight 11 twenty miles north of Manhattan, two or three minutes before it crashed into the north tower of the World Trade Center.
- "Looking at the general capitol area, one of the [NEADS] tracker techs thinks he spots the plane on radar."
- The 9/11 Commission Report: "Radar techs at NEADS/Rome are tracking Flight 77 near Washington, D.C."

Because the transponders in three of the four hijacked aircraft were switched off, and the remaining aircraft had changed its transponder code twice, the FAA had difficulty relaying the current aircraft positions to NORAD/NEADS by phone: even though they had access to the same radar data, NEADS could not find most of the flights. The intermittent data were of some use to the United States Secret Service. Barbara Riggs, then deputy director of the Secret Service, stated, "Through monitoring radar and activating an open line with the FAA, the Secret Service was able to receive real[-]time information about other hijacked aircraft. We were tracking two hijacked aircraft as they approached Washington, D.C."

== Flight 11 ==
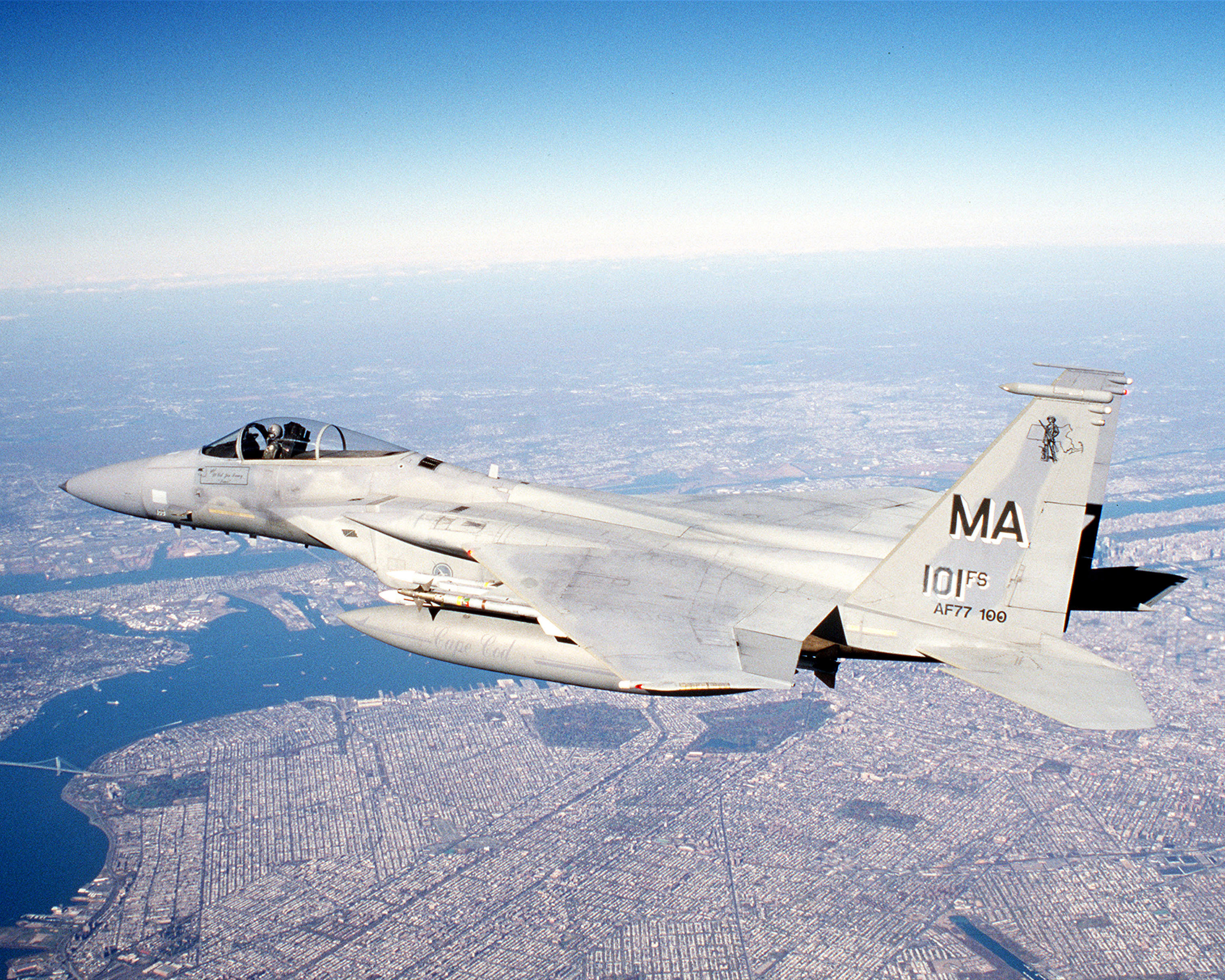
An F-15 from the 102nd Fighter Wing flies a patrol mission over New York after September 11th.

At 08:13, the pilots of Flight 11 responded to an instruction to turn 20 degrees to the right issued from Boston Center. A few seconds later, Boston Center instructed the pilots to ascend in altitude to which there was no response. Multiple attempts to contact the flight went unanswered and as it became apparent that Flight 11 began to pose an air hazard, air traffic controllers began to reroute arriving aircraft for adequate separation. Boston Center flight controller Tom Roberts said "We had pretty much moved all the airplanes from Albany, New York to Syracuse, New York out of the way because that's the track he was going on." At 08:19, Betty Ong, a flight attendant on Flight 11, called the American Airlines reservation desk to report that the flight was hijacked. At 08:21, Flight 11 stopped transmitting its transponder information concerning its altitude or identification.

At 08:24, the controller heard what he believed was the voice of a hijacker (believed to be Mohamed Atta) in a radio transmission from Flight 11. Two minutes later, the plane veered off course and turned south near Albany, New York. The Boston Center called the FAA Command Center at Herndon at 08:28 to report the hijacking. At 08:32, Herndon called FAA Headquarters in Washington. At 08:34, Boston Center contacted Otis Air National Guard (ANG) base to notify them of the hijacking. The controller at Otis directed Boston to contact NORAD's Northeast Air Defense Sector (NEADS), and then informed the Otis Operations Center to expect a call from NEADS ordering a scramble. At this time two pilots began to suit up and drove to their waiting F-15 fighter jets. At 08:37, Boston Center contacted NEADS in Rome, New York. This was the first report of a hijacking that reached NORAD.

Two F-15 alert aircraft at Otis Air National Guard Base in Falmouth, Massachusetts were ordered to battle stations (seated in their aircraft, engines not yet started). At 08:46, just as Flight 11 struck the North Tower of the World Trade Center, the two F-15s were ordered to scramble (an order that begins with engine start-up, a process that takes about five minutes), and radar confirmed they were airborne by 08:53. By that time, however, the World Trade Center's North Tower had already been hit.

At that time, NEADS personnel were still trying to pinpoint the location of Flight 11, but since the plane had already struck the North Tower, they were unable to. Without having a specific target located, military commanders were uncertain where to send the fighters. Boston Center controllers were still tracking Flight 11 as a primary target but were unable to communicate its location to NEADS by phone.

After news of an aircraft hitting the World Trade Center began spreading, no decision was made to alter the course of the F-15s of the 102nd Fighter Wing. A decision was made to send the Otis fighters south of Long Island rather than straight to New York City, as originally ordered by Maj. Nasypany of NEADS.

One of the two pilots, Lieutenant Colonel Timothy “Duff” Duffy, would later state he had already heard about the suspected hijacking (attributed to a phone call from the FAA's Boston Center) as he was supervising training exercises at Otis ANG base. Claiming to have a "bad feeling about the suspected hijacking", he and his wingman, Major Daniel “Nasty” Nash, decided to use their F-15s' afterburners.

Flying supersonically, the F-15s were just south of Long Island when United Airlines Flight 175 hit the World Trade Center's south tower. NEADS wanted to direct the fighters over Manhattan, but FAA air controllers, fearing collisions with civilian aircraft, told NEADS to hold off. According to the FAA, there is an average of 200 flights per 24 hours over the Hudson River in the vicinity of NYC. The fighters were then ordered in a holding pattern off the coast of Long Island (in military-controlled airspace), where they remained from 09:09 to 09:13. After the airspace was cleared, the Otis fighters were directed towards Manhattan, where they arrived at 09:25 and established a combat air patrol (CAP).

The 9/11 Commission report stated the Boston center tried to contact a former alert site in New Jersey, but it had been phased out. The report stated there were only seven "alert" sites (sites which had a pair of aircraft armed and on hand) in the United States by 9/11 and just two in the Northeast Air Defense Sector—Otis Air National Guard base in Massachusetts and Langley Air Force Base in Virginia.

== Flight 175 ==
United Airlines Flight 175 departed Logan Airport at 08:14 also bound for Los Angeles just like Flight 11. At 08:42, when Flight 175's pilots sent their last radio transmission, the aircraft's transponder was at that time transmitting the assigned code. Five minutes later, the transponder code changed twice, the first indication that the plane had been hijacked, although air traffic controllers would not notice for several more minutes. As word began spreading about the hijacking of Flight 11, air traffic controller David Bottiglia and other controllers searched the radar, looking for Flight 11. At 08:51, he noticed that Flight 175 had changed its transponder. He asked another controller to take over all of his other planes.

Bottiglia tried six times to contact Flight 175 between 08:51 and 08:55, with no response. The aircraft deviated from its assigned altitude at 08:51, and began its turn toward New York City at 08:52. At 08:55, Bottiglia told a manager at FAA New York Center that he thought Flight 175 had been hijacked. According to the 9/11 Commission report, this manager then "tried to contact regional managers but was told that they were discussing hijacked aircraft (presumably Flight 11) and refused to be disturbed." At around this time, Flight 175 flew within about 200 feet of Delta Air Lines Flight 2315, bound from Bradley to Tampa, Florida.

In the final moments before impact, according to eyewitness and Newark air traffic controller Rick Tepper, Flight 175 executed ".. a hard right bank, diving very steeply and very fast. As he was coming up the Hudson River, he made another hard left turn ..." One or two minutes before it crashed into the World Trade Center, Flight 175 narrowly avoided a mid-air collision with Midwest Airlines Flight 7 (Midex 7). At 09:01, a New York Center manager called FAA Command Center at Herndon. NEADS was notified at 09:03, when the New York Center manager called them directly, at about the time that Flight 175 hit the South Tower. The F-15s were still 20 minutes away from Manhattan when United Airlines Flight 175 impacted the WTC's south tower.

Although NORAD knew of no other hijacked aircraft, a precautionary measure was taken by ordering fighters at Langley Air Force Base to battle stations.

== Phantom Flight 11 ==
At 09:21, NEADS received another call from Colin Scoggins, who reported erroneously that Flight 11 was not, in fact, the aircraft that hit the North Tower at 08:46, as had been previously believed, but that it was still in the air and heading towards Washington. NEADS responded to this report by giving a scramble order to three fighters from the 119th Fighter Wing on alert at Langley Air Force Base at 09:24, and by 9:30 they were in the air. According to the 9/11 commission, the Langley pilots were never briefed by anyone at their base about why they were being scrambled, so, despite Langley officials' having been given the order from NEADS to fly to Washington, the unbriefed pilots ended up following their normal training flight plan, due east, out to sea. The fighters then flew north-west towards Washington, arriving around 10:00.

== Flight 77 ==
American Airlines Flight 77 took off from Dulles International Airport outside Washington D.C. at 08:20. The last transmission from the flight took place at 08:50:51. The flight proceeded normally until 08:54, when the aircraft deviated from its assigned course by initiating a turn to the south. Two minutes later, at 08:56, the plane's transponder was switched off, and its primary radar track was lost. Later, after hearing about the hijacked planes hitting the World Trade Center, Indianapolis Center suspected that Flight 77 may also have been hijacked, and shared this information with FAA Command Center at Herndon, where staff contacted FAA Headquarters in Washington at 09:25.

NEADS learned that the flight was lost at 9:34 during a phone call with the FAA Headquarters.

Washington Center: Now let me tell you this. I – I'll – we've been looking. We're – also lost American 77 ... They lost contact with him. They lost everything. And they don't have any idea where he is or what happened.

The FAA did not contact NEADS to make this report. This phone call was initiated by NEADS in an attempt to locate Phantom Flight 11 (see previous).

At 09:35, Colin Scoggins from the FAA's Boston Center again called NEADS to inform them that they had located an aircraft, which later turned out to be Flight 77, heading toward Washington D.C. at a high speed. Two minutes later, a NEADS radar technician spotted a target he believed to be Flight 77. This radar target was in fact Flight 77, but the target vanished as soon as it was discovered. NEADS officials urgently ordered the fighters from Langley to be sent to Washington immediately, but the plane struck the Pentagon at 09:37:46. The Langley fighters were still 150 miles away.

== Flight 93 ==
At 09:28, FAA Cleveland Center controller John Werth heard "sounds of possible screaming" coming from Flight 93 and noticed that the plane had descended 700 feet. At the time, Werth knew that some passenger jets were missing and that one had hit the World Trade Center in New York. At 09:32, he heard a voice saying "We have a bomb on board" and told his supervisor who then notified FAA Headquarters. At 09:36, FAA Cleveland called FAA Command Center at Herndon to ask whether the military had been notified – FAA Command Center told Cleveland that "FAA personnel well above them in the chain of command had to make the decision to seek military assistance and were working on the issue". At 09:49, the decision about whether to call the military had still not been made, and no one from the FAA called NEADS until 10:07, four minutes after Flight 93 had crashed near Shanksville, PA. Werth later commented:

Within three or four minutes, probably, of when it happened, I asked if the military was advised yet. Had anybody called the military? They said, "don't worry, that's been taken care of," which I think to them meant they had called the command center in Washington.

Dennis Fritz, director of the municipal airport in Johnstown, Pa., said the FAA called him several times as the plane approached his city, and even warned him to evacuate the tower for fear the jet would crash into it.

Had Flight 93 made it to Washington, D.C., Air National Guard pilots Lieutenant Colonel Marc H. Sasseville and Lieutenant Heather "Lucky" Penney were prepared to ram their unarmed F-16 fighters into it, perhaps giving their lives in the process.

== NORAD timeline ==
On September 18, 2001, NORAD issued a press release containing a timeline of the events of the September 11, including when they were contacted by the FAA. However, in 2004, the 9/11 Commission, after listening to tapes of communications, found that portions of this timeline were inaccurate. The NORAD timeline had served as the official account of the military response, and elements of that timeline appeared in the book Air War over America (notably information concerning United Flight 93, e.g., pages 59 and 63), and was given in testimony to the 9/11 Commission by NORAD's Major General Larry Arnold (retired), and Colonel Alan Scott (retired) in 2003.

Concerning Col. Scott's statements to the Commission. From Vanity Fair, August, 2006, page 5 of 9: —

In the chronology presented to the 9/11 commission, Colonel Scott put the time NORAD was first notified about United 93 at 9:16 a.m., from which time, he said, commanders tracked the flight closely. (It crashed at 10:03 a.m.) If it had indeed been necessary to "take lives in the air" with United 93, or any incoming flight to Washington, the two armed fighters from Langley Air Force Base in Virginia would have been the ones called upon to carry out the shootdown. In Colonel Scott's account, those jets were given the order to launch at 9:24, within seconds of NEADS's receiving the F.A.A.'s report of the possible hijacking of American 77, the plane that would ultimately hit the Pentagon. This time line suggests the system was starting to work: the F.A.A. reports a hijacking, and the military reacts instantaneously. Launching after the report of American 77 would, in theory, have put the fighters in the air and in position over Washington in plenty of time to react to United 93.

Concerning Gen. Arnold's statements to the Commission. From Vanity Fair, August, 2006, page 5 of 9: —

Major General Arnold explained to the commission that the military had been tracking United 93 and the fighters were in position if United 93 had threatened Washington. "It was our intent to intercept United Flight 93," Arnold testified. "I was personally anxious to see what 93 was going to do, and our intent was to intercept it." In testimony a few minutes [following Col Scott's testimony], however, General Arnold added an unexpected twist: "We launched the aircraft out of Langley to put them over top of Washington, D.C., not in response to American Airlines 77, but really to put them in position in case United 93 were to head that way.

Problems with the officers' statements to the Commission. From Vanity Fair, August, 2006, page 5 of 9: —

As the tapes [of F.A.A. and military communications on 9/11] reveal in stark detail, parts of Scott's and Arnold's testimony were misleading, and others simply false. At 9:16 a.m., when Arnold and [NEADS commander Colonel Robert] Marr had supposedly begun their tracking of United 93, the plane had not yet been hijacked. In fact, NEADS wouldn't get word about United 93 for another 51 minutes. And while NORAD commanders did, indeed, order the Langley fighters to scramble at 9:24, as Scott and Arnold testified, it was not in response to the hijacking of American 77 or United 93. Rather, they were chasing a ghost [Flight 11]. NEADS was entering the most chaotic period of the morning.

The Washington Post reported in its August 3, 2006, edition that:

Some staff members and commissioners of the Sept. 11 panel concluded that the Pentagon's initial story of how it reacted to the 2001 terrorist attacks may have been part of a deliberate effort to mislead the commission and the public rather than a reflection of the fog of events on that day, according to sources involved in the debate. Suspicion of wrongdoing ran so deep that the 10-member commission, in a secret meeting at the end of its tenure in summer 2004, debated referring the matter to the Justice Department for criminal investigation, according to several commission sources. Staff members and some commissioners thought that e-mails and other evidence provided enough probable cause to believe that military and aviation officials violated the law by making false statements to Congress and to the commission, hoping to hide the bungled response to the hijackings, these sources said.

In their 2007 book, Without Precedent, 9/11 Commission chairmen Thomas Kean and Lee H. Hamilton wrote that 9/11 conspiracy theories had grown primarily because of problems in the previous story about the planes:

If the military had had the amount of time they said they had ... and had scrambled their jets, it was hard to figure out how they had failed to shoot down at least one of the planes. ... In this way, the FAA's and NORAD's inaccurate reporting after 9/11 created the opportunity for people to construct a series of conspiracy theories that persist to this day. The tapes recordings ... from the day were extremely important – they provided a real-time record of what was happening that enabled our staff to relive the day, instead of relying solely on people's memory or their hurried notes of what took place.

The NORAD timeline showed that the FAA had notified NORAD earlier than the taped evidence indicated, and the 9/11 Commission Report faulted the FAA for not contacting NORAD quickly enough. The NORAD timeline showed notification of the hijacking of Flight 175 at 08:43, while the tapes show NORAD was notified at the same time Flight 175 hit the South Tower at 09:03. According to Scoggins, however, "With American Airlines, we could never confirm if [Flight 11] was down or not, so that left doubt in our minds."

According to the 9/11 Commission Report, at approximately 08:32, the FAA's Herndon Command Center established a teleconference between Boston, New York, and Cleveland Centers so that Boston Center could help the others understand what was happening. Controllers at the Boston Center knew American Airlines Flight 11, which departed at 07:59 from Boston for its flight to Los Angeles, was hijacked 30 minutes before it crashed. They tracked it to New York on their radar scopes: 'I watched the target of American 11 the whole way down,' said Boston controller Mark Hodgkins. Several Boston controllers tracked American 11 for its entire flight.

The FAA mistakenly thought Flight 11 was still possibly airborne, in part because American Airlines did not confirm that they had lost all contact with Flight 11 until some time after 10:00. The NORAD timeline showed that the fighters scrambled from Langley at 09:24 were in response to a 09:21 FAA report of the hijacking of Flight 77; NORAD never mentioned the phantom Flight 11.

The problem, Scoggins told me later, was that American Airlines refused to confirm for several hours that its plane had hit the tower. This lack of confirmation caused uncertainty that would be compounded in a very big way as the attack continued. (Though airlines have their own means of monitoring the location of their planes and communicating with their pilots, they routinely go into information lockdown in a crisis.)

— From Michael Bronner of Vanity Fair

In October 2003, the 9/11 Commission issued a subpoena to the FAA to turn over documents after the commission's investigators determined that material had been withheld. A tape was made of oral statements of New York air traffic controllers, intended to be used as an aid in their making written statements, then destroyed. A quality assurance manager at the FAA's New York Center denied the staff access to the tape and later destroyed it. Its existence came to light in 2003 interviews with FAA staff. The Commission subpoenaed the tape and other records from the FAA on Oct. 16, 2003. In November 2003, the Commission issued a subpoena to NORAD; its second subpoena issued to a federal agency for failure to turn over documents.

In July 2004, the 9/11 Commission made referrals to the Inspectors General of both the US Department of Transportation and the Defense Department to further investigate whether witnesses had lied.

Commission staff believes there is sufficient evidence that the false statements made to the commission were deliberately false.

— John Farmer, Jr., the commission's senior counsel

The DoD Inspector General's report was released to the New York Times in August 2006 under a FOIA request. According to the report, military officials were exonerated of intentionally misleading the 9/11 Commission in their testimony. A summary of the report called for more steps to improve the Defense Department's ability to investigate "a future significant air event," including more effective event logging methods

The US Transportation Department's Inspector General's investigation report was released on August 31, 2006. FAA personnel were also exonerated of knowingly misleading the 9/11 Commission.

== Air Sovereignty Alert (ASA) preparedness ==
=== Background ===
In January 1982, the FAA unveiled the National Airspace System (NAS) Plan.

The plan called for more advanced systems for Air Traffic Control, and improvements in ground-to-air surveillance and communication with new Doppler Radars and better transponders. Better computers and software were developed, air route traffic control centers were consolidated, and the number of flight service stations reduced. There is no overlap of responsibility between DoD and FAA within the NAS: this is why within FAA-controlled airspace the FAA is in charge of controlling and vectoring hijack intercept aircraft.

The radar systems at NEADS had been scheduled to be upgraded in a contract awarded in 1997, but the project cost had been revised upwards by 700% causing the Air Force to cancel the contract and begin plans to re-open the bidding process.

Planning for terrorist use of hijacked airplanes as missiles had been considered for some military exercises prior to 9/11, though all but one of those exercises considered only aircraft originating from other countries.

The US and Canadian militaries, particularly NORAD and the US Air National Guard, have been tasked with interception duties concerning hijacked aircraft. Their primary duty was assistance to law enforcement. Quoting Maj. Gen. Larry Arnold: "We always viewed an attack from within our borders as a law enforcement issue, ...". Military aircraft were to be used to assure positive flight following, report unusual observances, and aid search and rescue in the event of an emergency. Jamie Gorelick of the 9/11 Commission had taken part in those security measures as Deputy Attorney General, and described the measures in Commission hearings. In April 2001, NORAD considered an exercise in which an aircraft of foreign origin was hijacked by terrorists and flown into the Pentagon, like a missile, but rejected the scenario as implausible. Five months later, a similar scenario occurred. However, in January 2002 Maj.Gen. Larry Arnold, stated: "...we did not honestly think about hijacked airliners being used in suicide attacks."

=== Efforts post-9/11 ===
In April 2003, a contract was awarded to upgrade the Battle Control Systems by summer 2006.

Later systems, such as the Joint-Based Expeditionary Connectivity Center (JBECC), merge civil and military radar data. Once deployed, the JBECC can fuse and correlate target data covering about 400 miles (640 km) of coastline from disparate airborne, land- and sea-based sensors creating fire-control-quality tracks that can guide interceptors to engagement.

Major General Larry Arnold, USAF, ret. stated in May 2001, that JBECC will provide "... more time to scramble fighters and see any target, whether small, large, low or high."

General Arnold also stated "In the immediate aftermath of 9/11 we had to hook up to FAA radars throughout the country, install compatible radios for nationwide coverage between our command and control agencies and our airborne assets, and purchase a new command and control computer system to integrate radar and communications. The initial investment was for $75 million, and this number has grown to nearly $200 million."

Organizations outside the FAA (e.g., the airlines, Department of Defense, NASA, and international sites) also have access to the FAA's Enhanced Traffic Management System (ETMS) software and/or data for purposes of flight management and tracking.

=== 2009 Government Accountability Office report on ASA ===
In January 2009, the Government Accountability Office (GAO) published "Homeland Defense: Actions Needed to Improve Management of Air Sovereignty Alert Operations to Protect U.S. Airspace" on the Air Force's Air Sovereignty Alert mission. According to the report:

The Air Force has not implemented ASA operations in accordance with DOD, NORAD, and Air Force directives and guidance, which instruct the Air Force to establish ASA as a steady-state (ongoing and indefinite) mission. The Air Force has not implemented the 140 actions it identified to establish ASA as a steady-state mission, which included integrating ASA operations into the Air Force's planning, programming, and funding cycle. The Air Force has instead been focused on other priorities, such as overseas military operations. While implementing ASA as a steady-state mission would not solve all of the challenges the units must address, it would help them mitigate some of the challenges associated with conducting both their ASA and warfighting missions.

The report further stated:

The GAO analysis also showed that none of the Air Force's key homeland defense documents—the Air Force homeland defense policy directive, the Air Force homeland operations doctrine, and the Air Force homeland defense concept of operations—fully defines the roles and responsibilities for, or accurately articulates the complexity of, Air Sovereignty Alert operations.

The report made the following recommendations to improve ASA operations:

We recommend that the Secretary of Defense direct the Commander of the U.S. command element of NORAD to routinely conduct risk assessments to determine ASA requirements, including the appropriate numbers of ASA sites, personnel, and aircraft to support ASA operations.

We recommend that the Secretary of Defense direct the military services with units that consistently conduct ASA operations to formally assign ASA duties to these units and then ensure that the readiness of these units is fully assessed, to include personnel, training, equipment, and ability to respond to an alert.

We recommend that the Secretary of Defense direct the Secretary of the Air Force to take the following five actions:

• Establish a timetable to implement ASA as a steady-state mission.
• Implement ASA as a steady-state mission according to NORAD, DOD, and Air Force guidance by

• updating and implementing the ASA program action directive;
• updating the Air Force homeland defense policy, homeland operations doctrine, and concept of operations to incorporate and define the roles and responsibilities for ASA operations; and
• incorporating the ASA mission within the Air Force submissions for the 6-year Future Years Defense Program.

• Develop and implement a plan to address any projected capability gaps in ASA units due to the expected end of the useful service lives of their F-15s and F-16s.
• Develop and implement a formal method to replace deploying units that still provides unit commanders flexibility to coordinate replacements.

== See also ==
- United States government operations and exercises on September 11, 2001
