= Sonnenfeldt =

Sonnenfeldt is a surname. Notable people with the surname include:

- Richard Sonnenfeldt (1923-2009), American engineer and corporate executive
- Helmut Sonnenfeldt (1926–2012), known as Hal Sonnenfeldt, American foreign policy expert
- Michael W. Sonnenfeldt (born 1955), American entrepreneur

== See also ==
- Sonnenfeld (disambiguation)
