= Sonnenfeld (surname) =

Sonnenfeld is a surname.

Notable people with the surname include:

- Barry Sonnenfeld (born 1953), American film maker
- David A Sonnenfeld (born 1953), professor at the State University of New York College of Environmental Science and Forestry
- Jeffrey Sonnenfeld (born 1954), American business professor
- Kurt Sonnenfeld (born 1962), American videographer and 9/11 conspiracy theorist granted asylum by Argentina
- Portia Sonnenfeld, founder and music director of Princeton Symphony Orchestra
- Sigismond Sonnenfeld (1846–1929), Director-General of the Jewish Colonization Association
- Stefan Sonnenfeld (born 1964), American colorist and entrepreneur
- Viktor Sonnenfeld (1902–1969), Croatian translator and philosopher
- Yosef Chaim Sonnenfeld (1849–1932), chief rabbi of Jerusalem, noted for his vehement opposition to Zionism
