= IMUnified =

Group of companies

- Formation: July 25, 2000; 26 years ago
- Website: https://web.archive.org/web/20020127133538/https://www.imunified.org/

IMUnified, formed on July 25 2000, was a coalition of companies created to jointly develop open standards for instant messaging (IM). The founding members were AT&T, Excite@Home, iCAST, MSN, Odigo, Phone.com, Prodigy, Tribal Voice and Yahoo!. Notably absent from the list was AOL, an industry giant whose protocols were incompatible with those used by the rest of the industry, who did not intend to allow for interoperability, and whose FCC hearings on their merger with Time Warner where scheduled for five days after the coaltion's formation. IMUnified was not the first time that AOL's competitors tried to force interoperability on them, but they have blocked the few workarounds that were attempted before, as they considered them "attacks" on their systems. At the time AOL stated that they exclude IM traffic from external networks for privacy and security reasons, but reportedly began to work with the IMUnified group on an open standard.

A month after the coalition's creation, IMUnified announced the completion of a technical specification for an interoperable IM service, fulfilling the promise made at the time of the group's creation.

The coalition disbanded some time before 2003 after talks among IM providers fizzled. After the settlement between AOL and Microsoft, MSN and AOL in their public statements agreed that creating an interoperable system is challenging, and the mission of IMUnified became a relic of the past.
