= Radical Islamism =

Radical Islamism may refer to:

- Islamic extremism
- Islamic fundamentalism
- Islamic terrorism
- Islamism
- Jihadism
- Wahhabism
