= Southwest Airlines Flight 1763 =

2000 aircraft incident

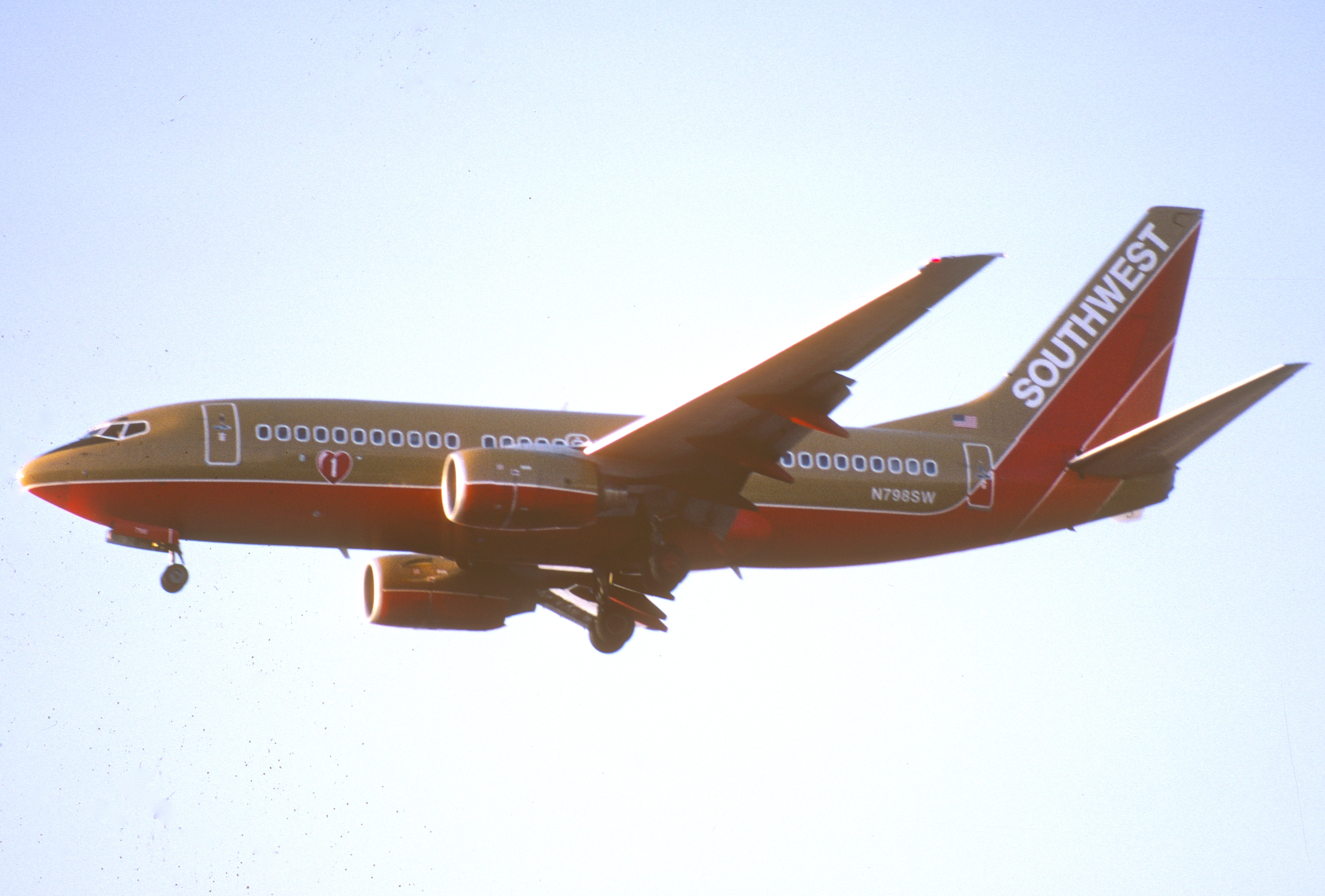
- N798SW, the aircraft involved in the incident, photographed in 2003

Incident
- Date: August 11, 2000
- Summary: Air rage

Aircraft
- Aircraft type: Boeing 737-7H4
- Operator: Southwest Airlines
- IATA flight No.: WN1763
- ICAO flight No.: SWA1763
- Call sign: SOUTHWEST 1763
- Registration: N798SW
- Flight origin: Harry Reid International Airport, Las Vegas, Nevada, United States
- Destination: Salt Lake City International Airport, Salt Lake City, Utah, United States
- Occupants: 126
- Passengers: 121
- Crew: 5
- Fatalities: 1
- Injuries: 1
- Survivors: 125

Southwest Airlines Flight 1763 was a scheduled passenger flight, operated by Southwest Airlines, from McCarran International Airport, in Paradise, Nevada, to Salt Lake City International Airport, in Salt Lake City, Utah. On August 11, 2000, Jonathan Burton, a Las Vegas resident, stormed the cockpit door of the Boeing 737-7H4 while in flight, in an apparent case of air rage. The 19-year-old was subdued by six to eight other passengers with such force that he died of asphyxiation. The death was initially believed to have been a heart attack.

== Incident ==
Burton charged the cockpit door, kicking it open and sticking his head in. The pilot and co-pilot pushed him out, and six to eight passengers then restrained him, some holding him down with their feet on his neck, causing him to suffocate.

There were conflicting reports of Burton's air rage and the events that occurred during the flight. CBS News reported the conclusion of the U.S. Attorney's office that criminal charges would not be filed because the death was not intended. Time published an article by Timothy Roche entitled "Homicide In The Sky" in which it described the ruckus Burton initially created. He was briefly subdued, but then struck an off-duty officer who had been keeping him in his seat, and began running up and down the aisle of the plane. The group of men then pinned Burton to the floor. The Guardian reported that fellow passenger Dean Harvey said that one of the men involved continued jumping on Burton's chest even after he had been told that Burton was contained.

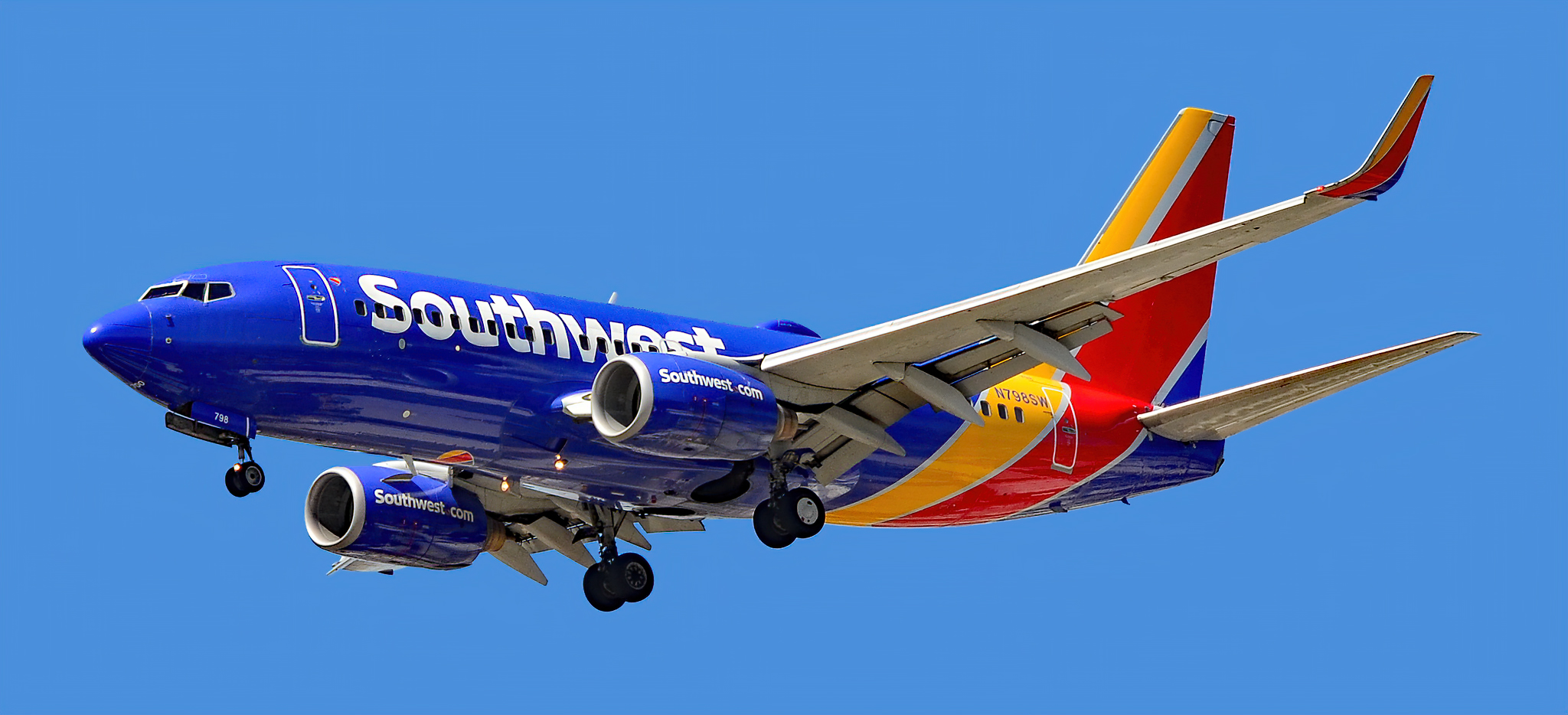
N798SW, the aircraft involved, now seen in the current Southwest livery

The medical examiner's autopsy report stated that when police arrived, "Mr. Burton was lying face down with at least one individual standing on his neck." Burton had low levels of marijuana and cocaine in his body but this was not capable of explaining his outburst, which was out of character, and he had no history of violence or mental illness.

== In popular culture ==
Four months later, an episode of CSI: Crime Scene Investigation featured a plot paralleling Burton's death, “Unfriendly Skies”, where five strangers board a plane and kill a man after believing him to be trying to take down the plane; the episode was televised December 8, 2000. A year later, playwright Lucas Rockwood turned the incident into a play, Fifty Minutes, which was performed a few weeks before the September 11 attacks.

An episode of Mile High “Series 2 Episode 7” (first screened on April 4, 2004) also featured a plot echoing the death of Burton. In that episode, a young man of Arabian appearance is treated with suspicion by other passengers, panics, and attempts to reach the cockpit. Other passengers subdue him and strangle him to death in the process.

== See also ==
- 2000 in aviation
- List of accidents and incidents involving airliners in the United States
- List of air rage incidents
