= Kurt Sonnenfeld =

American photographer

- Born: December 18, 1962 (age 63)
- Occupation: Photographer, videographer, writer
- Citizenship: United States
- Genre: Non-fiction

Kurt Sonnenfeld (born December 18, 1962) is an American granted political asylum in Argentina after convincing former President of Argentina Fernando de la Rúa and other high-ranking officials of the conspiracy theory that there had to have been foreknowledge of the 9/11 attacks because, among other things, the massive gold vaults at World Trade Center 6 had already been opened and emptied of their contents before the attack. Sonnenfeld had been employed as a videographer for the U.S. Federal Emergency Management Agency (FEMA) and had unusual authority to document the rubble scene at the World Trade Center site after the September 11 attacks in New York in 2001. On New Year's Eve 2002, at his Colorado home, Sonnenfeld's wife Nancy died of a gunshot to the head; Sonnenfeld said she had committed suicide, but police arrested him and charged him with her murder. In 2002, the murder charges were dropped for lack of evidence, but the prosecutor reserved the right to refile the charges. Sonnenfeld departed for Argentina soon thereafter, and had his 9/11 videos sent to Argentina along with his personal belongings. He remarried to an Argentine and made a voluntary visit to the US embassy in Buenos Aires to secure a visa for his new wife. The couple went on to have children. The US federal government has made numerous attempts to extradite him back to the US for the 2001 murder of his wife Nancy. The Argentine government cited its opposition to the death penalty in its denial of the extradition requests, despite the death penalty not being a factor in this case. Sonnenfeld insists that the US government is using the death of his wife Nancy to get at him for not handing over all the videos, which he has stated prove that the official 9/11 narrative of a surprise attack is false.

== Books ==
On May 8, 2009, Kurt Sonnenfeld published El Perseguido ("The Pursued").

== Arrest ==
Nancy Sonnenfeld died from a gunshot wound to the head on January 1, 2002. Police suspected Kurt Sonnenfeld of her murder and arrested him. His fingerprints were not on the gun found at the scene and his gunpowder residue tests were negative. Gunpowder residue was found on his wife's hand and her fingerprints were found on the magazine. A note in Nancy's handwriting was found by investigators. Prosecutors dropped the case in June 2002 for lack of evidence but maintained the right to refile. The renewed interest by prosecutors in Colorado was premised on alleged confessions Sonnenfeld made to two cellmates while he was in jail awaiting trial.

In 2002, after prosecutors in the office of former Denver District Attorney Bill Ritter dismissed the charges due to insufficient evidence, Sonnenfeld visited Argentina and married Paula Duran. The US made an extradition request and Sonnenfeld was imprisoned for seven months in the Villa Devoto prison, until an Argentine federal judge rejected the U.S. extradition request because Sonnenfeld faced the death penalty if convicted in the U.S., as Argentina does not recognize the death penalty. His testimony was requested by 9/11 families. He and his wife testified to the Argentine Congress about his videos. Initially, the Argentine court refused the extradition request, saying they had not received sufficient assurances from Colorado that Sonnenfeld would not be executed. Colorado assured Argentina that it would not seek the death penalty. On January 2, 2015, the Argentine Supreme Court announced its decision to extradite Sonnenfeld to the United States and on September 16, 2015, the Court approved the extradition. However, on her last day in office in 2015, Argentine president Cristina Kirchner reversed the Argentine Supreme Court decision and granted Sonnenfeld permanent political asylum.
