= Global Guardian =

US military annual training exercise

140th Wing F-16 intercepting a B-52 as part of Global Guardian, February 2026

Global Guardian is an annual training exercise sponsored by the United States Strategic Command in conjunction with Air Force Space Command and NORAD. Its main purpose is to test the military's command and control procedures in the event of nuclear warfare.

Global Guardian is performed in conjunction with "Vigilant Guardian", the annual training exercise conducted by NORAD in which a threat to North American airspace is simulated. The simulated scenario is varied from year to year.

== Global Guardian and the September 11 attacks ==
The September 11 attacks on September 11, 2001 occurred during that year's Global Guardian and Vigilant Guardian joint exercises. That year, according to the 9/11 Commission Report, Vigilant Guardian 'postulated a bomber attack from the former Soviet Union' on North America. The Russian 37th Air Army was, in fact, conducting major bomber exercises across the Arctic and Atlantic at this time, amongst the largest carried out by them since 1993. Both the American and the Russian exercises were cancelled after the attack.

In contrast to the 9/11 Commission Report, Michael Ruppert has characterized Vigilant Guardian as "a hijacking drill, not a cold war exercise". He cites direct quotes from participants which indicate "that the drill involved hijacked airliners rather than Russian Bombers". General Arnold, Tech. Sgt. W. Powel and Lt. Col. Dwane Deskins have stated that when they first were informed about hijacked airliners they thought it was "part of the exercise".

This is also corroborated by tape recordings from the control room of NORAD's Northeast headquarters. "When they told me there was a hijack, my first reaction was 'Somebody started the exercise early,'" Lieutenant Colonel Kevin Nasypany told Vanity Fair author Michael Bronner . Bronner further writes:

"The day's exercise was designed to run a range of scenarios, including a "traditional" simulated hijack in which politically motivated perpetrators commandeer an aircraft, land on a Cuba-like island, and seek asylum."

The 9/11 Commission investigated the possibility that Vigilant Guardian preparations compromised the military's response to the September 11 attacks. They concluded that the exercise may have had, in fact, the effect of expediting the response to the attacks.

According to page 17 of the 9/11 Commission Report, when the Federal Aviation Administration’s Boston control center called the Northeast Air Defense Sector (NEADS), NEADS response was "is this real world or exercise?". According to the 9/11 Commission's staff statement No. 17, for instance, page 26 of the commission's final report documents FAA's report of a "phantom flight 11" at 9:21, 35 minutes after the real flight 11 crashed into the WTC and even longer after the war games are alleged to have been aborted. However, General Ralph Eberhart told the 9/11 Commission that "it took about 30 seconds" to make the adjustment to the real-world situation.

The Vigilant Guardian war game was discussed in chapter 1, footnote 116 of the 9/11 Commission Report:

"On 9/11, NORAD was scheduled to conduct a military exercise, Vigilant Guardian, which postulated a bomber attack from the former Soviet Union. We investigated whether military preparations for the large-scale exercise compromised the military's response to the real-world terrorist attack on 9/11. According to General Eberhart, "it took about 30 seconds" to make the adjustment to the real-world situation. Ralph Eberhart testimony, June 17, 2004. We found that the response was, if anything, expedited by the increased number of staff at the sectors and at NORAD because of the scheduled exercise. See Robert Marr interview (Jan. 23, 2004)."
