= Flight incidents =

Flight incidents may refer to:

- Aviation accidents and incidents
- List of air rage incidents
