= Vispring =

British bed company

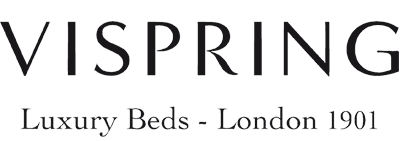
- Industry: Furniture
- Founded: 1901 in London
- Founder: James Marshall
- Headquarters: Ernesettle Lane, Plymouth, United Kingdom
- Key people: James Marshall, Inventor
- Products: Mattress, beds
- Website: www.vispring.com

Vispring, formerly known as Vi-Spring, is a bed company founded in 1901 in Eagle Street, Holborn, London. Manufacturing mattresses and beds made of natural materials. Part of Vispring's notability comes from being the first English bed makers to use the patent of Canadian-born engineer, James Marshall pocketed spring coil now commonly referred to as the Marshall coil. By 1914 Marshall Mattress' mattress collections were found in luxurious hotels, clubs and ocean liners, including The Queen Mary & The Titanic.

Vispring was founded by two Marshall Mattress agents of James Marshall who granted them patent rights to produce Marshall mattresses in England. They continued to use the Marshall name until the early 1930s at which point they rebranded as Vispring.

Vi-Spring moved to Ernesettle, Plymouth in the Southwest of England, in 1971.

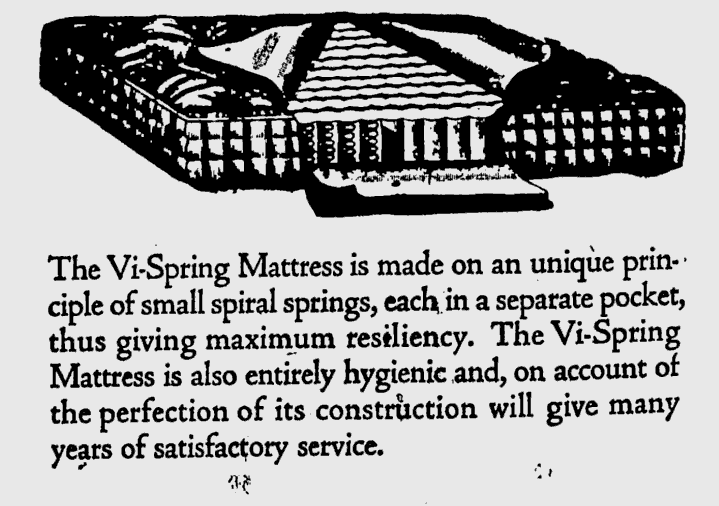
Early description of Vispring mattress.

Vispring beds are handmade using natural materials such as wool, cotton, horsehair, coir, silk, cashmere, mohair and alpaca fleece rather than synthetic materials and foam. The “VI” in Vispring stands for the Roman numeral 6. This represents the six turns to each coil which has been their trademark. The coils are made with Vanadium Steel Wire, which acts to improve spring resilience properties and creates more consistent springing that may be less likely to suffer height loss with use.

In 2022 Vispring opened their first flagship store at 22 Regent Street St. James in London.
