= Air mattress =

Type of mattress

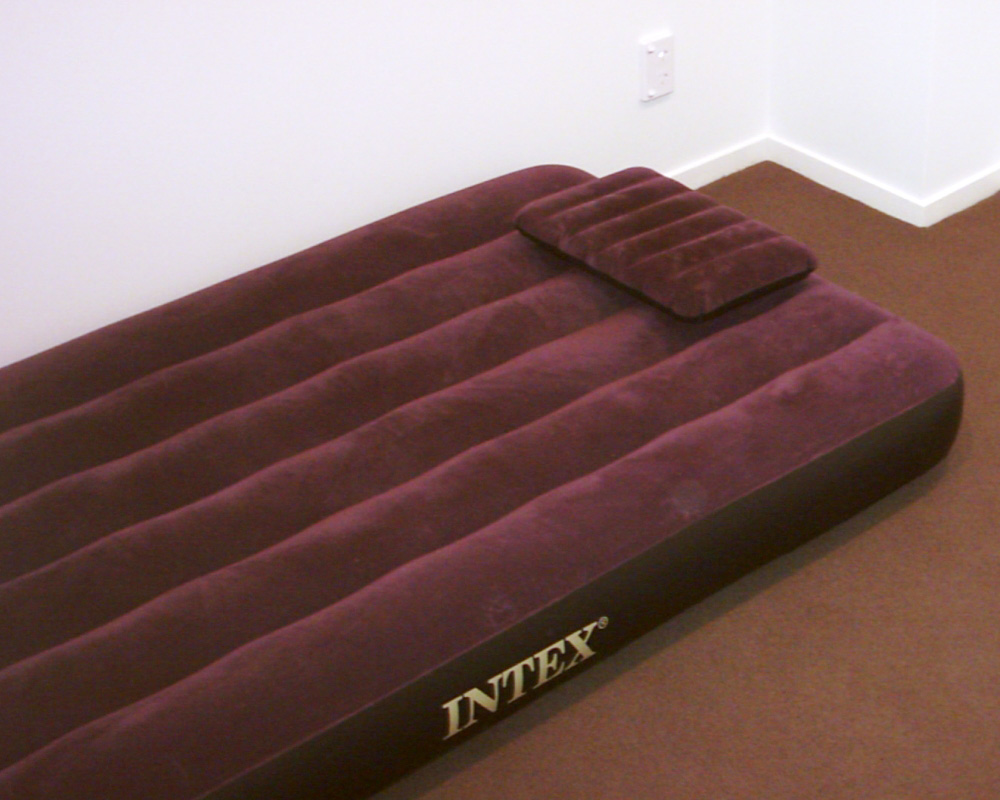
An airbed such as might be used for temporary guest accommodation

An air mattress or airbed is a type of mattress that uses air as its primary support system. The term may refer to temporary inflatable mattresses made of vinyl or PVC for camping and guest use, or permanent air-chamber mattresses, which use multiple internal air bladders and electronic pumps and are designed for long-term home use.

Because of its buoyancy, it is also often used as a water toy or flotation device, and in some countries, including the UK and South Africa, is called a lilo ("Li-lo" being a generic trademark — derived from the phrase "lie low") or a Readybed.

== For sleeping ==
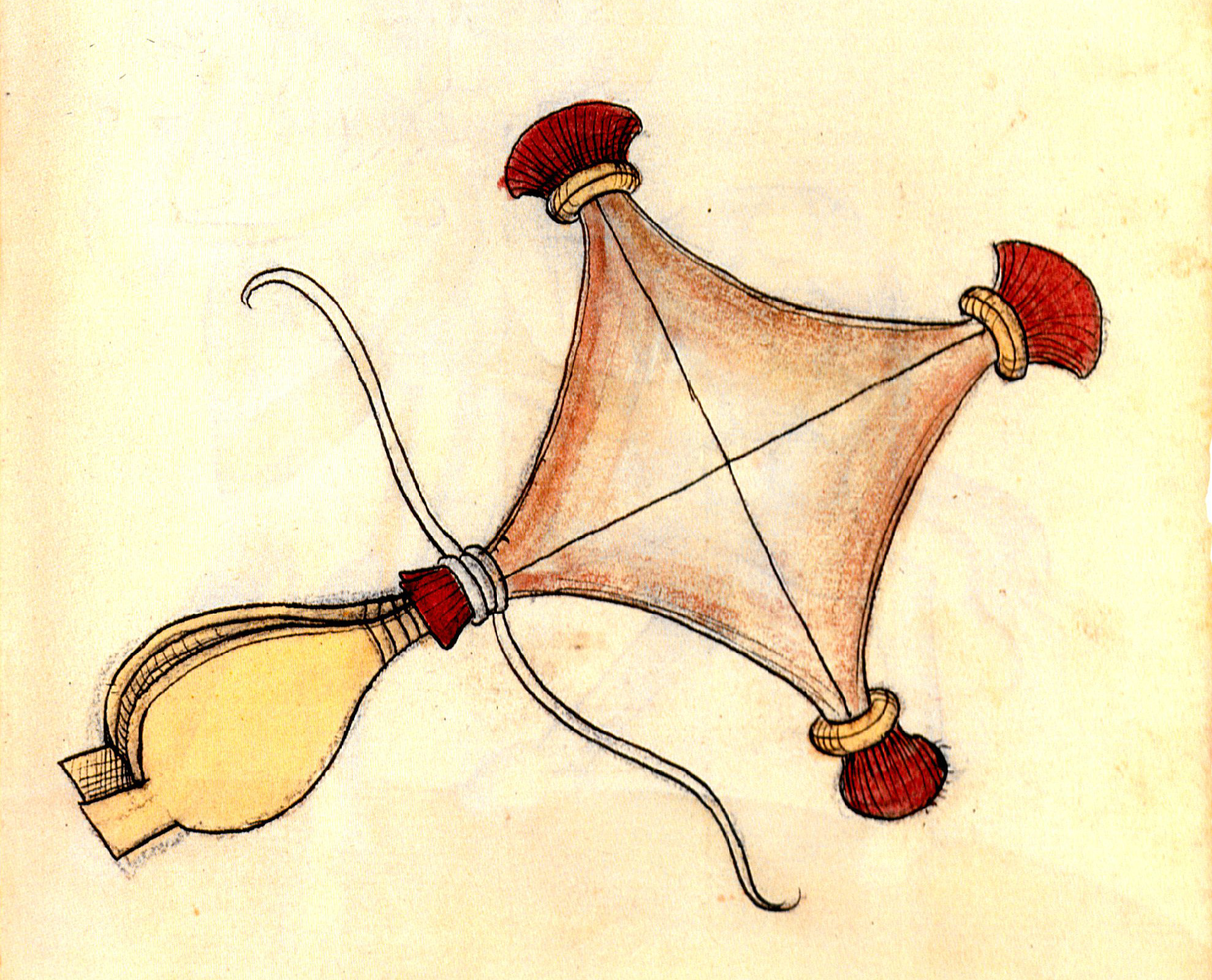
Early air mattress by the German engineer Konrad Kyeser (c. 1405)

An air mattress, also known as an airbed or a blow-up bed, is an inflatable mattress made of polyvinyl chloride (PVC) or textile-reinforced urethane plastic or rubber. The deflated mattress can be compacted and carried or stored in a small form. They are inflated by blowing into a valve, either with a manual or an electric pump. Some are automatically inflated when a valve is opened, up to a certain pressure with additional inflation manually or by pump.

Air mattresses are used for camping, temporary or full-time home use, and may be optimized to combine several uses (e.g., camping and guest use) while others are single purpose. Air mattresses may have customized shapes, such as wheel cutouts for use in the cargo area of a pickup truck or SUV.

Sleeping pads are lightweight, reduced-size and reduced-thickness air mattresses intended for camping and backpacking, and may feature a layer of foam insulation under the air chambers. Higher quality air chambers use vulcanized rubber, covered in canvas or of polyurethane with a cloth shell or tick(ing). Permanent air beds will look almost like conventional beds with the exception of having a hose (one air chamber) or hoses (two air chambers) coming out of the head of the bed. These hoses will be connected to an air inflation device, with two outlet valves, that will have a remote control(s) so that each person can adjust the firmness of his or her side to his/her own exact needs. The firmness can be adjusted up or down, with the simple push of a button, on the remote(s).

A US government safety agency has warned against letting infants sleep on air mattresses, because they can be too soft and suffocate smaller children (especially those below the age of 8 months) within folds or while entrapped between the mattress and the bed base. Additionally, there have been several recent governmental studies and regulations enacted due to the poisonous nature of the phthalate plasticizers contained within most PVC vinyl air beds and other soft vinyl products. The European Union has made similar efforts to prevent the use of vinyl materials in toys and bedding.

=== Airbeds ===
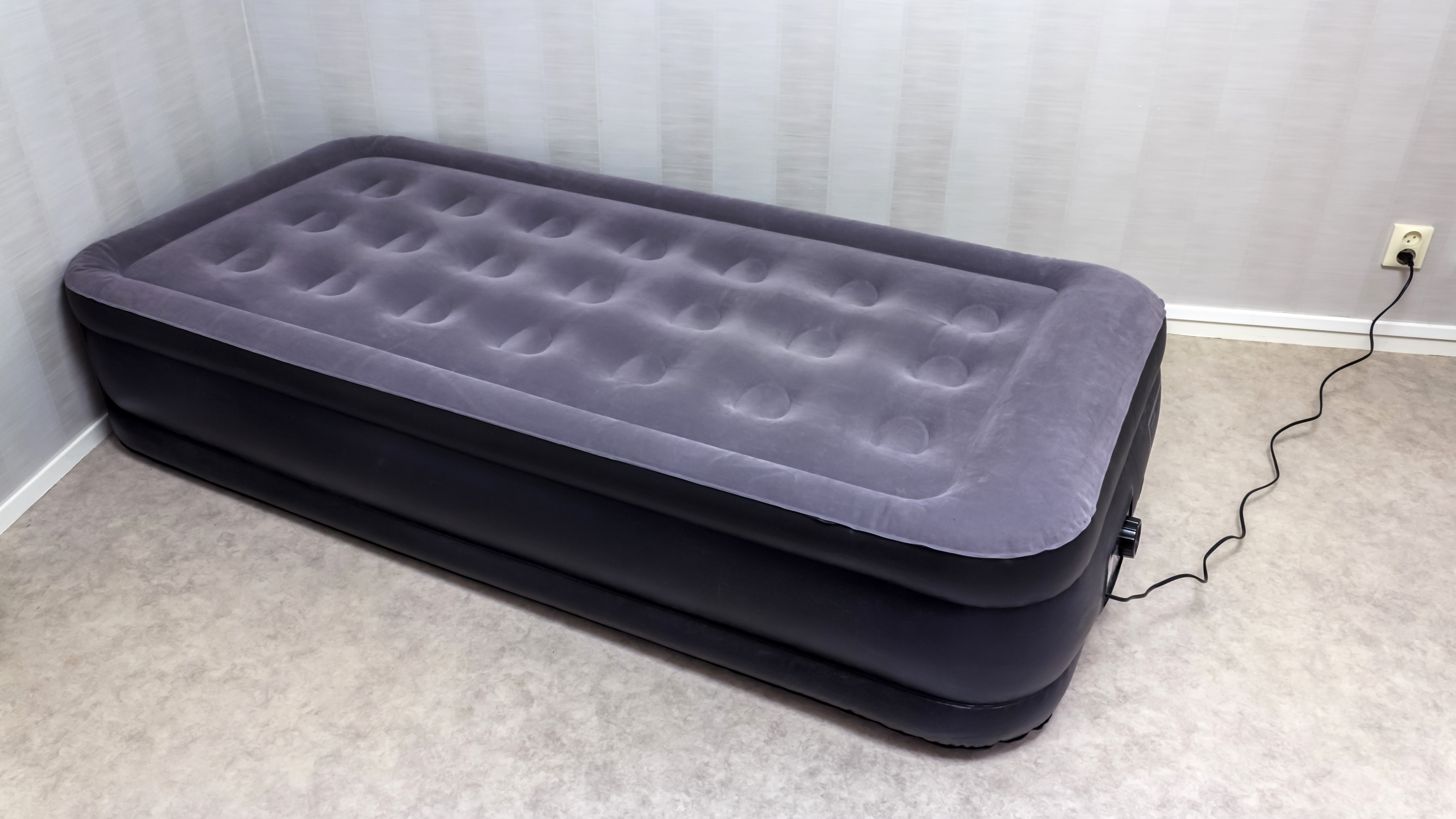
A high airbed mattress with internal electric air pump

Larger, more elaborate air mattresses (known as "airbeds" in British English) have come on the market in recent years that are intended for guest use or as permanent beds in the bedroom. Bed sizes for temporary air beds range from twin to king size but few guest bed manufacturers offer king size as most guest air beds are sold outside the United States where king-size mattresses are not standard. Most permanent airbeds use easy-to-find conventional sheets and bedding. California King (or Western King) sheets and bedding may be more difficult to find as this size was originally conceived for the waterbed industry.

Raised guest or temporary beds are typically raised off the ground to keep users away from the floor and offer a more traditional mattress experience. Though 'raised' airbeds are off the ground, they are not designed for full-time use, as the base of the bed is an air chamber and not a solid foundation.

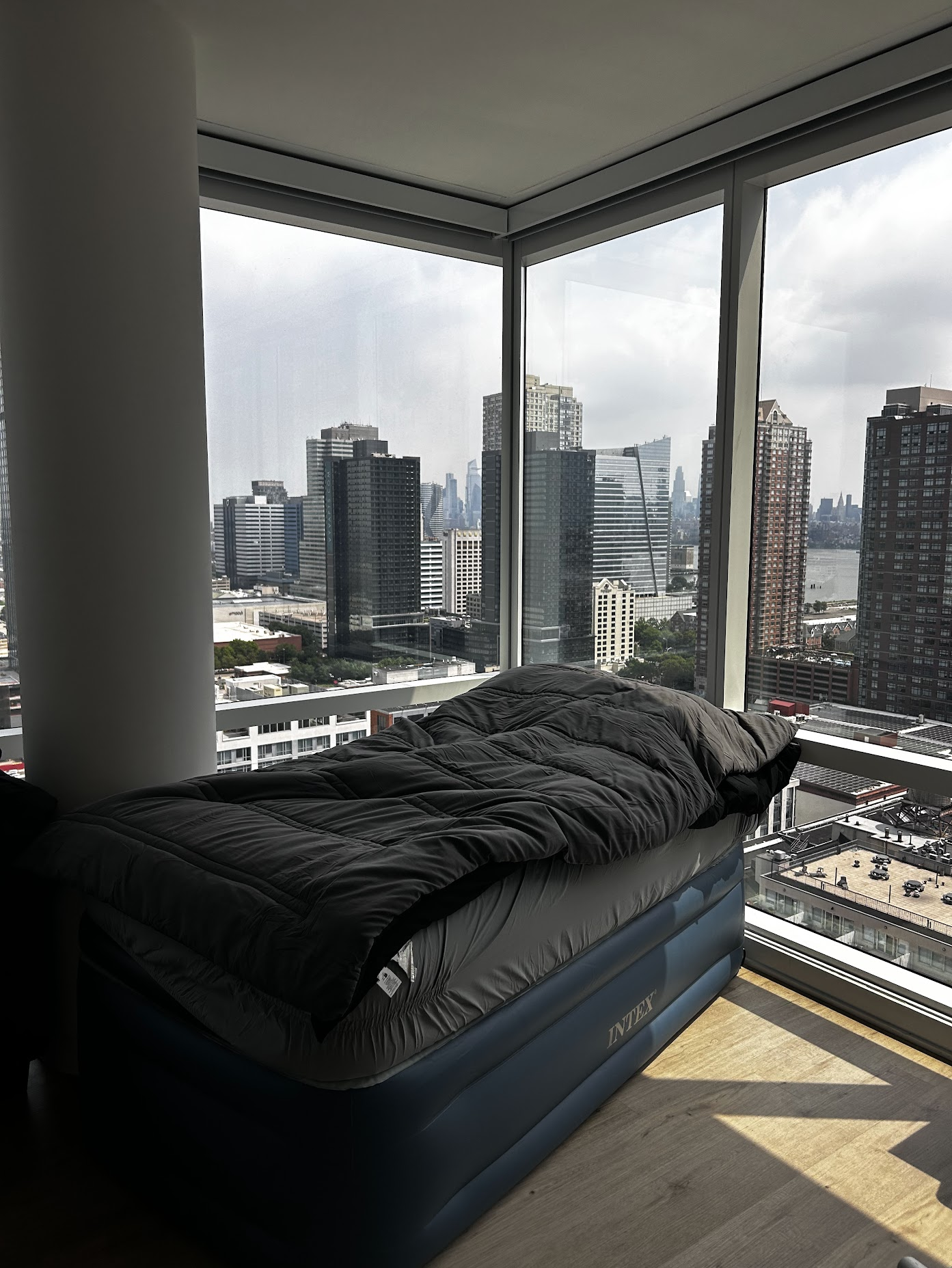
Example of an airbed mattress used in a modern high-rise apartment.

In the 2020s, airbed mattresses saw increased use among young professionals, remote workers, and startup founders living temporarily in shared apartments or short-term rentals. Their portability and low cost made them common in major tech hubs such as San Francisco and New York, especially among workers with transient housing or flexible lifestyles. [citations needed]

=== Health benefits ===
Air mattresses can also improve the quality of life (and potentially provide some measure of relief) for people who suffer with back pain. Having the ability to adjust the firmness of a mattress to accommodate different body shapes, sizes, and weights, can be a factor in the healing process. Air mattresses are sometimes used to protect bedridden people from pressure sores, which can create life-threatening ulcers. Hygiene issues regarding sweat, oils, or other bodily fluids are easily removed by washing the air mattress with warm water along with mild detergents such as liquid soap or heavily diluted bleach and letting it air dry in the shade. New air mattresses can be washed in the same manner as with hygiene-related issues but using hot (70 °C [158 °F]) instead of warm water. Some air mattresses can be manufactured without the use of materials that may release VOCs or other toxic compounds from the manufacturing process (which can exacerbate allergies in children or other sensitive individuals) are available.

== For recreation ==
=== As a water toy ===
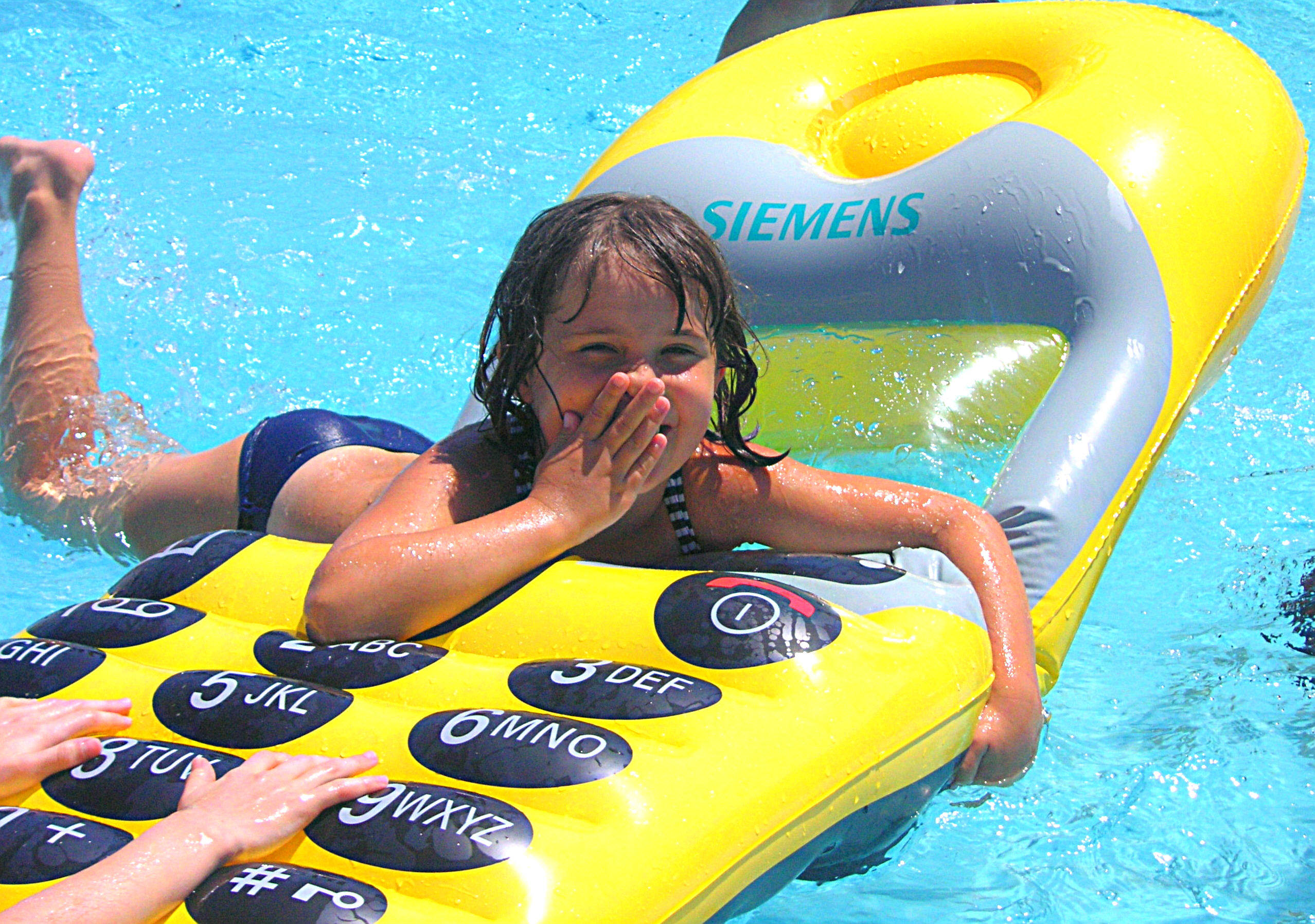
An air mattress in the shape of a flip phone

The term air mattress may also refer to a certain inflatable swimming pool or beach toy, which has an air-sac "pillow" and several (usually four or five) tubes running its length. Also called a "lilo" (UK, AUS, NZ, SA), "pool air mat", "air mat", "pool lounge", or "float(ing) mat(tress)", it is used to recline on the water surface. The Li-Lo trademark for a rubberised material products was registered in UK on 19 April 1944 and in the USA on 25 September 1947 by P. B. Cow and Co Ltd. An inflatable air mattress for recreational use was advertised as one of the Li-Lo brand of products at the British Industries Fair in London 1949. Although it bears some resemblance to an air mattress, it is typically not built as strongly and may not reliably stay inflated all night long, making it impractical for use as a bed.

== Industry ==
Permanent-use adjustable-firmness airbeds became popular particularly after the market leader Select Comfort began a major marketing campaign around 2001. The original airbed was manufactured by Comfortaire in 1981, which was later purchased by Select Comfort, in January 2013 for $15.5m. Select Comfort announced on 30 March 2017, that they were ceasing all third-party retail sales, of the Comfortaire Line of products, essentially shutting down the Comfortaire Brand. In November 2017, Select Comfort Corporation changed their corporate name to Sleep Number Corporation. Other airbed manufacturers include Boyd Specialty, InnoMax, and American National.

Airbeds used for camping or guests include the Aerobed, sold by Jarden subsidiary The Coleman Company.

== See also ==
- List of inflatable manufactured goods
