= Stuffed article =

Stuffed article is a legal or industry term describing items such as mattresses, beds, upholstery, pillows, plush toys, teddy bears etc., i.e.: fabric items stuffed with an inert, resilient material, such as cotton, kapok, or polyurethane foam. Such articles sold as new in the United States usually are required to have a tag called a law label describing the fabric and stuffing used.
