= Spring Air Company =

American mattress company

- Industry: Mattress manufacturing
- Founded: 1926
- Founder: Francis Karr
- Headquarters: Elk Grove Village, Illinois, U.S.
- Products: Mattresses
- Parent: Spring Air International
- Website: www.springair.com

Spring Air Company is a mattress company based in the United States. It was founded in Chicago in 1926 when Francis Karr patented a mattress design with free-end coils. Because of the heavy weight, high transportation costs, and low value per unit weight of mattresses, they are often manufactured locally. The company is thus a licensing organization, with local licensees manufacturing the mattresses under a common name for national marketing. Like a cooperative, the licensees own the Spring Air name. Spring Air has factories across the world.

As of 2006, it is the fourth largest US brand of mattresses (behind Sealy, Serta, and Simmons). It is based in Elk Grove Village, Illinois.

== Merger with Consolidated Bedding ==
In 2007 The Spring Air Company merged with Consolidated Bedding, Inc. of Tampa, FL, Spring Air's largest licensee and simultaneously acquired six other Spring Air licensees operating eight mattress manufacturing facilities in the United States. The unified Company will employ 1,150 employees in 14 locations, including its headquarters facility that will remain in the Chicago area. The merger will solidify Spring Air's position as the leading value "S" brand on every retail floor. The acquired manufacturing facilities are in: Atlanta, GA; Birmingham, AL; Chelsea, MA (Boston); Denver, CO; Phoenix, AZ; St. Louis, MO; Salt Lake City, UT; and Lacey, WA (Seattle). They will join Consolidated Bedding's existing facilities in: Columbus, OH; Carrollton, TX (Dallas); City of Industry, CA (Los Angeles); New Brunswick, NJ; and Tampa, FL.

H.I.G. Capital LLC, a private equity investment firm with more than $4 billion of equity capital under management, provided the equity funding for the transaction. H.I.G. began a relationship with Spring Air in 2005 when it funded the merger of American Bedding Industries and Spring Air Partners, the two largest Spring Air licensees.

In May 2009 the company that owned the Spring Air name - Consolidated Bedding - went bankrupt.

The Spring Air Name was then purchased by E&E Bedding and turned into Spring Air International.

== Spring Air International ==
In May 2009 Spring Air abruptly ceased operations and in June emerged under new ownership and management as SAI (Spring Air International). Spring Air was repurchased by one of its original owners Edward Bates. Today Spring Air has expanded its presence around the world adding over 15 new facilities globally.

The Spring Air brand is now manufactured at 13 U.S. facilities and 22 international licensees that operate in 32 countries.

== Current licensees ==
- Grand Rapids Bedding, Grand Rapids, Michigan
- Springfield, IL
- Midwest Sleep Products, Grand Forks, N.D., and Toledo, Iowa.
- Pennsylvania Bedding, Old Forge, Pa.
- Pleasant Mattress Inc., Fresno, Calif.
- Sleep Inc., formerly known as Winco Bedding, Carrollton, Texas.
- C.M. Bedding Group, Inc. Fall River, Massachusetts.
- Spring Air-Greensboro, N.C.
- Massindo Group, Indonesia.
- Belvedore International, India.
- Hanax, Republic of Korea.

== Current lines ==
- Nature's Rest
- Back Supporter
- Four Seasons
- Sleep Sense
- Chattam and Wells
- Spine Support
