= Tuft & Needle =

American e-commerce and manufacturing company in Phoenix, Arizona

- Company type: Brand
- Industry: Manufacturing; e-commerce
- Founded: July 19, 2012; 13 years ago
- Founders: Daehee Park; John-Thomas Marino
- Headquarters: Phoenix, Arizona, U.S.
- Number of locations: 7 stores (2018)
- Area served: United States
- Products: Mattresses
- Revenue: ▲$170M (2017)
- Owner: Serta Simmons Bedding
- Website: www.tuftandneedle.com

Tuft & Needle is an American bed-in-a-box company that launched in 2012. On September 28, 2018, the company was acquired by Serta Simmons Bedding.

== History ==
Tuft & Needle started as an e-commerce company founded on July 19, 2012 by Daehee Park and John-Thomas Marino. They both met via the entrepreneur program at Pennsylvania State University.

The company generated $1 million in sales at the end of 2013. The company later opened its first brick and mortar showroom in the company's Phoenix headquarters in December 2014.

Tuft & Needle acquired 'TN.com' domain in September 2015. The company established its headquarters at O.S. Stapley Hardware buildings on Grand Avenue in Phoenix in December of 2015, after a city grant of $300,000 was used to improve and repair the buildings by a real estate developer. In 2015, Tuft & Needle grew to over 100 employees and earned over $100 million in revenue.

After turning down investment offers from venture capital investors, Park and Marino took out a $500,000 loan from Bond Street in 2016. In 2016, the company launched a national billboard campaign entitled "Mattress Stores Are Greedy."

In 2017, the company had $170 million in sales. Tuft & Needle spent over $14 million in media during the same year.

On September 28, 2018, Tuft and Needle closed a merger with mattresses manufacturer Serta Simmons Bedding. In November 2018, they also announced a partnership with Amazon to release an Amazon-exclusive mattress called "The Nod." by Tuft & Needle.

On January 23, 2023, Serta Simmons Bedding filed for Chapter 11 Bankruptcy.

== Retail presence ==
As of January 2019, Tuft & Needle operates seven retail stores in Scottsdale, Gilbert, Seattle, Kansas City, Raleigh, Portland, and Dallas. Their products are also stocked at select Lowe's, Crate & Barrel and Walmart locations across the United States.
