= Bunky =

Bunky may refer to:

== People ==
- Bunky Echo-Hawk (born 1975), Native American artist and poet
- Vernice Bunky Green (1933–2025), American jazz musician and educator
- Bunky Harkleroad, basketball coach
- George Bunky Henry (1944–2018), American golfer in the 1960s and '70s
- Carl Bunky Loucks, American politician
- Norris "Bunky" Mack, a member of the band The Swallows
- Rudolph G. Bunky Matthews (1915–1976), American football and basketball coach
- Bill Bunky Miller, reality show contestant
- Darius "Bunky" Rose, a member of the American hard rock band The Fifth
- Bill Sheppard (music producer) (1922–1997), music promoter, music producer, and executive
- Andrea "Bunky" Skinner, member of folk rock duo Bunky and Jake
- Veston Bunky Stewart (1931–2007), American baseball pitcher

== Other uses ==
- Bunky (band), a band on the Asthmatic Kitty label
- Bunky (comic strip), a comic created by Billy DeBeck
- Bunky board, support for a bunk bed

== See also ==
- Bunkie (disambiguation)
- Bunki, an era of Japanese history spanning from 1501 to 1504
- Bunkyō, one of the 23 special wards of Tokyo, Japan
