= Mattress coil =

Component of a mattress

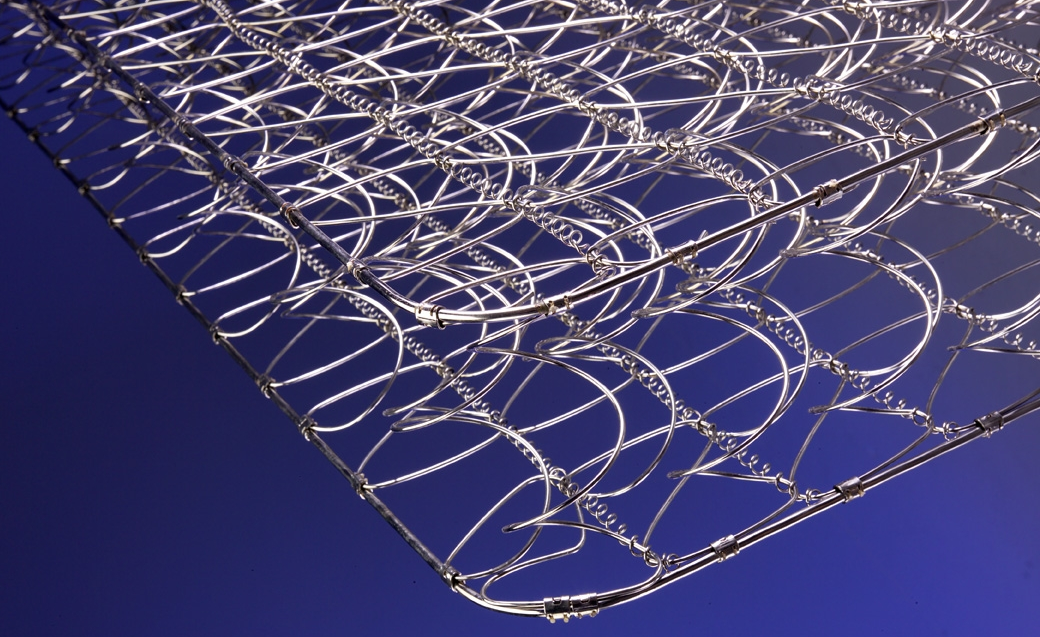

Mattress coils, also known as mattress springs, are coil springs used in a mattress. Coils are primarily used in the core (support layer) of innerspring mattresses, which is their original use. In recent years, small "micro-coils" are used in the upholstery (comfort layer) of mattresses, primarily with a coil core ("coil-on-coil" construction), but sometimes with other core types.

Mattress coils were introduced in the mid-late 19th century, and remain popular in the 21st century, particularly in the United States.

== Types ==
There are four types of mattress coils. A key desideratum is "response range", meaning the change in firmness as the spring is compressed – initially soft, to conform to the body, then hard, to provide support. In increasing order of response range and cost, the types are:

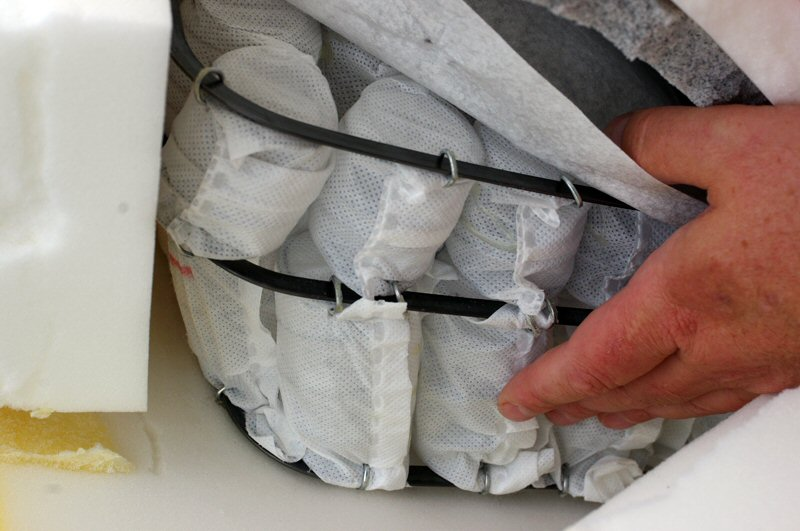
Pocket springs

- Continuous coils (the Leggett & Platt brand name is "Mira-coil") is an innerspring configuration in which the rows of coils are formed from a single piece of wire. They work in a hinging effect similar to that of offset coils.
- Bonnell coils are the oldest and most common. First adapted from buggy seat springs of the 19th century, they are still prevalent in mid-priced mattresses. Bonnell springs are a knotted, round-top, hourglass-shaped steel wire coil. When laced together with cross wire helicals, these coils form the simplest innerspring unit, also referred to as a Bonnell unit.
- Offset coils are an hourglass type coil on which portions of the top and bottom convolutions have been flattened. In assembling the innerspring unit, these flat segments of wire are hinged together with helical wires. The hinging effect of the unit is designed to conform to body shape. LFK (Left Facing Knot) coils are an offset coil with a cylindrical or columnar shape.
- Marshall coils, also known as wrapped or encased coils or pocket springs, are thin-gauge, barrel-shaped, knotless coils individually encased in fabric pockets—normally a fabric from man-made, non-woven fiber. Some manufacturers pre-compress these coils, which makes the mattress firmer and allows for motion separation between the sides of the bed. As the springs are not wired together, they work more or less independently: the weight on one spring does not affect its neighbors. This allows them to react to pressure independently instead of all together, which minimizes movement and allows for a more buoyant feel.

== History ==
While coil springs were invented in the 15th century, they were not used in mattresses until the mid-late 19th century, following the use of upholstery coil springs in furniture and carriages.

Microcoils were introduced in the early 21st century, and as of 2014 are a small part of the market.

The bed coil spring was patented by Louis Andrew Vargha. Some modern feedback on coils within mattresses cast aspersions on some of its attributes such as abrasion on coils eventually culminating into prodding, and the audibility of the coils, as it may decrease privacy for intimate moments such as sexual activity.

== Manufacturers ==
The mattress coil market is quite concentrated – the leading suppliers are Leggett & Platt (founded 1883) of Carthage, Missouri and AGRO International (founded 1948) of Bad Essen, Germany. Others include HSM (company) (formally Hickory Springs, founded 1944) of Hickory, North Carolina; Spinks (founded 1840) of Leeds, United Kingdom and Subiñas (founded 1959) of Mungia, Biscay province, Spain.

== See also ==
- Upholstery coil springs
- Box-spring
