= Upholstery coil springs =

Component of modern upholstery

Upholstery spring

Upholstery coil springs are an important part of most modern upholstery. The consumer usually never sees the construction features of an upholstered piece. The overall quality of the materials and construction dictate the comfort level of an upholstered piece and its ability to satisfy the consumer over the long term. A basic upholstered piece may be composed of a frame, springs, foam, cushioning, padding, and textiles.

Coil springs are individual coils, open at both ends. They may be knotted at one end. When attached to webbing and twine-tied at the top, they form the platform on which the loose cushion rests.

== History ==
Ancient coiled helical or spiral shaped wire objects resembling springs have been discovered in the Balkans and across Europe by archaeological teams. Such objects dating from as far back as 4000 BC, the beginning of the first Bronze Age, abound in museums and collections. Wire coiled objects, possibly designed as rings or jewelry, nevertheless exhibit the properties of extension or compression springs.

Three technologies drove the development of coiled springs in the mid-1500s, enabled by advances in the quality of steel; these were time-pieces (e.g., clocks and portable watches), firearms (e.g., cannons and pistols), and vehicles (e.g., coaches and carriages). The latter emerged in 16th-century Hungary. William Felton's Treatise on Carriages of 1796 and George Thrupp's History of Coaches of 1877 give examples of evolving applications of springs in transportation that directly transferred to furniture.

Germany and Sweden were known even in fifteenth-century Europe as having the best steel because indigenous iron had .05-.07% carbon, which is excellent spring grade iron for steel.

In 1690, Sir Ambrose Crowley used German Syrian steel for quality watch springs.

Sir Robert Hooke wrote his Lecture on Springs in 1678. In it he explains how anyone can take well formed wire of various compositions and wind it around a form to create a spring. His work demonstrated the phenomenon known today as Hooke's law, which characterizes springs as providing a restoring force proportional to the extent of their deformation.

Clive Edwards, furniture historian, wrote, "One of the most tantalizing questions in eighteenth century furniture is that of springing. Commonly thought to have been a nineteenth century innovation, there is evidence of earlier use. The initial demands for springs appear to have come from the coach builders and the second came from furniture-makers. Coach builders were seeking to improve the ride of vehicles as well as to improve upon the interior comfort seats for passengers." The English guild category is known as "The Worshipful Company Of Furniture Makers" but in sixteenth through nineteenth century times this trade was known as cabinet-makers.

The common nexus was the iron workers and blacksmith shops that were developing carriage springs and supplying hardware parts for cabinet-makers.

George Thrupp illustrated a coil spring used in a carriage presented to the French Academy in 1703.

In 1706, Henry Mills received Great Britain patent 376 "For A New Mathematical Instrument For New Sorts Of Springs...And That The New Invented Springs Are Made And Contrived of several forms-semicircular, circular, angular, oval, or other forms..." These spring were lighter weight, a set weighing only 20 pounds versus other coach springs in use that weighed 120 pounds per set. These were helical extension springs also known as "worm" springs due to the spiral nature.

in 1762, Richard Tredwell, Great Britain Patent of Rotherham in the County of York, received a patent for a leaf spring for carriages, and, again, in 1763, Richard Tredwell received Great Britain Patent 792 for "Springs For Carriages". There are four pages in this patent and the fourth page clearly shows nine iterations of helical suspension or worm springs and the patent clearly states it is "my new method of making and constructing springs for hanging of coaches". Coil compression springs would not be used for hanging a carriage. Tredwell's patent had no contribution to upholstery spring developments.

In 1780, William Blakey, an expert clock historian, wrote The Art Of Making Watch Springs (translated by M Wayman) where he said that, "The art of making watch and clock springs could possibly be, of all mechanical operations, the one which provides the greatest amount of knowledge of the physical properties of steel. In the process of discovering the qualities of iron which are essential in order to convert it into steel, the artisan cannot avoid recognizing the different qualities of metal, such as its hardness, its malleability, its elasticity, etc." He also said it was not easy to ascribe a date in the discovery of steel and its qualities—but this began when clocks and watches were being perfected.

In 1822, Georg Junigl of Vienna, Austria, received a "privilidg" which was an Austrian legal term for a patent for a wire spring used in combination with upholstery filling. This patent was announced in the April 24, 1822 edition 94, page 1, column 1, item 3, that Mr. Junigl, a bourgeoisie upholsterer of Vienna, had been granted the patent. He died in 1840 according to the Vienna, Austria newspaper.

In 1826, Samuel Pratt of New Bond Street, in the Parish of St. George, Hanover Square in the County of Middlesex, received Great Britain Patent 5418 for "Beds, Bedsteads, Couches, Seats and Other Articles of Furniture". This patent used coiled shaped springs in an arrangement to minimize for furniture for a nautical sailing vessel.

In 1828, Samuel Pratt received Great Britain Patent 5668 for "Elastic Beds And Cushions", which was to be an improvement in compression spring arrangements in furniture. Page 5 of the patent depicts two hour-glass shaped wire coil compression springs in both circular and triangular shapes.

In 1833, August Boschow, a Viennese upholsterer, received an Austrian "privileg" (patent) that was published in the Vienna, Austrian newspaper on June 26, 1833. Boschow invented a new type of a “clock” spring designed for use in carriages, chairs, and beds; the spring supported the human body in a sitting or supine position.

In 1834, John Saville Crofton published a book entitled The London Upholsterer's Companion, The Art Of Spring Stuffing. Crofton, a veteran of the upholstery trade, describes using nine circular steel coil springs 7 inches high and 3 1/2 inches wide, made of number 8 charcoal wire, for upholstering easy chairs. His book also describes spring upholstered sofas, beds, mattresses, pillows, and carriage and coach seats also made of circular coil spring of lighter gauges of wire. Crofton notes that coil springs have been in the trade a number of years, indicating the original date of the practice is unknown and this work in the British Library has been unheeded in history accounts on this topic. Crofton wrote on page 34 of his book, in the chapter about "Easy Chairs, Spring-stuffing":

In manufacturing spring-stuffed seats, it is necessary to web and bottom on the under side and action of the springs. The seat represented in the design requires none springs--seven inches high, and three and a half over, and these springs be made from No. 8 charcoal wire; sew them firmly to the seat, equi-distant, but not too near each other; having done this, tie them together, using the greatest precaution in doing so, in the first place, that they may be made to assist in action; and, in the next, that they may be kept perpendicular and act freely, upon which most essentially depend on the ease of the seat, and the durability and style of workmanship; then fasten the ends of the twine, with which the springs are tied, to the frame of the chair.

Charcoal wire was an early nineteenth-century term that designated crucible manufacturing process for making better quality steel for drawing spring wire.

The hand-tire style of crafting springs by tying each to adjacent springs is a method that dates back as far as Crofton writes—and probably much earlier, as he indicates. Modern upholstery methods may still refer to "hand tied" springs or "eight-way hand-tied springs" which are closely related to Crofton's method as described.

In 1834 Crofton also informs that the upholsterer could make their own springs by obtaining wire and bending it around a wooden mold or purchasing springs by the hundred weight.

In 1843, Holland & Sons offered upholstered chair, sofas, and other articles with descriptions such as "putting spring in frames", "spring stuffed", "double spring stuffed", and "spring stuffed cushions.

Considering the evidence from the clock, carriage, and furniture trade, it is likely that upholstery springs may have been in use by local craftsmen before the eighteenth century, certainly existed in the eighteenth century, became normal by the beginning of the nineteenth century, and all types of springs were being developed and commonly used by mid-nineteenth century as both the British and American patent records clearly document. Patents do not necessarily mean first use but can only be used to evaluate and estimate trends.

In 1849, T. E. Warren of the United States of America received patent 6740, which was for a complex leaf spring used in seating and was utilized by the American Chair Company for seating on trains.

In 1850, Alexander Oechslin received an Austrian patent for an "improvement in spiral spring upholstery".

Between 1855 and 1900, hundreds of wire spring patents were issued in Great Britain and the United States for seating and bedding. These British patents can be viewed in a Master Abridgement of British Patents in Class 52 1855-1900.

Washburn & Moen Manufacturing, one of America's first wire drawing companies, founded in 1834, manufactured wire for a range of products from piano wire to telegraph wire, barbed wire, and wire for coil springs. Between 1837 and 1847, Washburn's wire quality dictated that all iron billets 12’ by 1-1/8” were imported from Sweden specifically for drawing wire; once in the United States, the billets were rolled into rods at mills in Troy, New York; Fall River, Massachusetts; or Windsor Locks, Connecticut. The Smithsonian Institution and Library of Congress retain portions of their historical records.

In 1869, Timothy Rose and Platt Buell received an American patent, number 97,705, for a coil bed spring.

In 1871, Edwin Bushnell of Poughkeepsie, New York, received an American patent, number 4,616, for "An Improvement In Spring Mattresses".

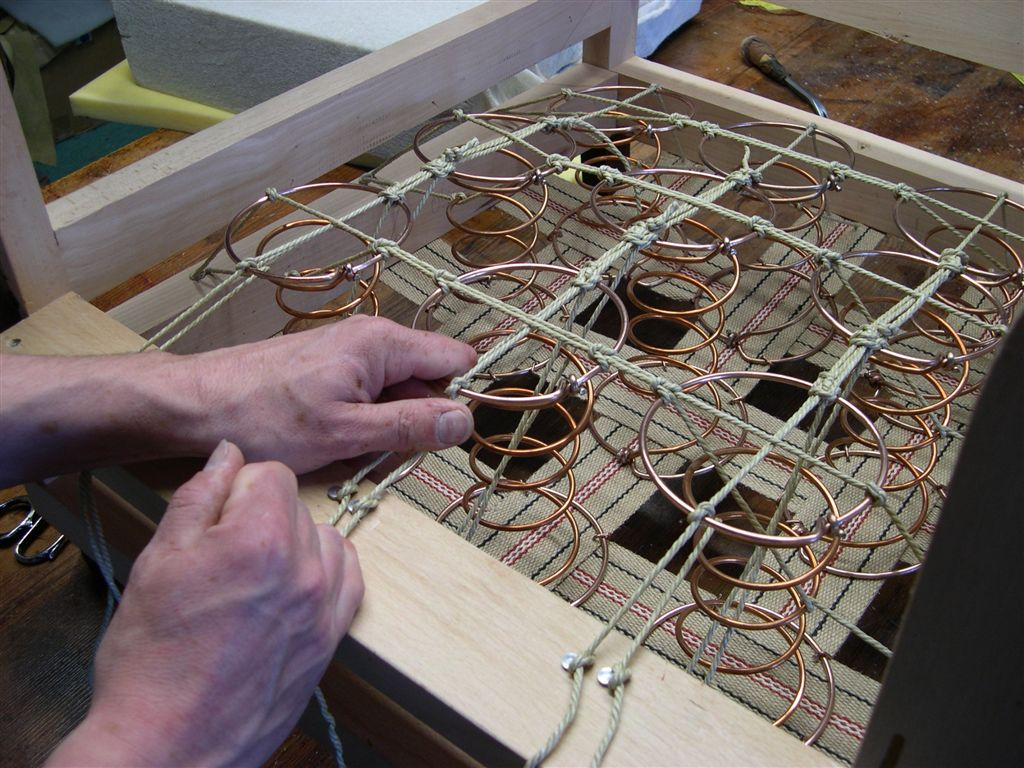
Box spring used for a chair seat

Prior to the early 1900s, springs were used as bed bases or box springs; these spring sets were not covered with fabrics. There were no "innerspring" mattresses manufactured until after 1900. Bushnell's patent has been cited as an innerspring but it was an under bed spring—which in the mid-1800s was also called a mattress or base layer of a bed.

Crofton's work of 1834 and Felton's work of 1796, in light of archeological finds and great works such as Sir Robert Hooke's Lecture on Springs, clearly indicate that coil springs came into use in the 17th or 18th century. The time, location, and inventors are unknown.

== See also ==
- Mattress coil
- Box spring
