= Bunkie =

Bunkie may refer to:

- Bunkie, Louisiana, a city in Avoyelles Parish, Louisiana, United States
  - Bunkie station, an historic train station in Bunkie, Louisiana
- Semon "Bunkie" Knudsen (1912–1998), a prominent automobile executive
- Bunkie Blackburn (1936–2006), NASCAR racecar driver
- Bunkie board, mattress support for a bunk bed

== See also ==
- Bunky (disambiguation)
- Bunki, an era of Japanese history spanning from 1501 to 1504
- Bunkyō, one of the 23 special wards of Tokyo, Japan
