= Amerisleep =

American mattress company

- Company type: Private
- Industry: Mattresses
- Founded: 2010; 16 years ago
- Founder: Firas Kittaneh, Mo Kittaneh, Joe Holt
- Headquarters: Scottsdale, Arizona, US
- Products: Mattresses, bedding, pillows, bed frames
- Website: amerisleep.com

Amerisleep is an American memory foam mattress and bedding company based in Scottsdale, Arizona. The company was founded in 2010 and it has retail locations in Arizona, Colorado, Texas, Oregon, Houston and three stores in South Korea.

== History ==
Amerisleep was founded in 2010 in Arizona by Firas Kittaneh, Mo Kittaneh, and Joe Holt.

In 2017, the company rebranded and opened its first store in Arizona. Amerisleep registered their business in London, United Kingdom.

In 2019, it announced plans to expand to Houston with three retail stores.

The company started distributing Amerisleep franchises in 2023.

== Products ==
Amerisleep sells memory foam mattresses, bedding, bed frames, pillows, and adjustable bases made from low-VOC materials. Amerisleep manufactures 5 mattress styles, offers a 100-night in-home trial and 20 years warranty for the all mattresses. Amerisleep manufactures all its BioPur mattresses in Indiana.
