= Law label =

Required label on new items describing filling materials inside bedding

A law label is a legally required tag or label on new items describing the fabric and filling regulating the United States mattress, upholstery, and stuffed article (e.g., pillows, plush toys, comforters, etc.) industry. Typically these tags begin with a phrase such as This tag may not be removed under penalty of law except by the consumer. Some states require tags on used bedding as well.

The purpose of the law label is to inform the consumer of the hidden contents, or "filling materials" inside bedding and furniture products. The law label was born in the early 1900s to prevent these articles from being further manufactured with contents such as horse hair, corn husks and whatever else a manufacturer could find to use that the consumer would never see, similar to food labeling.

Laws requiring these tags were passed in the United States to inform consumers as to whether the stuffed article they were buying contained new or recycled materials.

Such stuffed article labelling laws exist in other jurisdictions, for example, the tag required on duvets sold in the United Kingdom, that describe the materials used and the tog insulation rating.

Many mattress manufacturers such as Sealy, Simmons and Serta require these tags to be produced in the event of a warranty claim.

== Popular culture ==
The wording of the warnings printed on some law labels has caused a common misconception in the USA that removing such a label under any circumstance is a crime, prohibiting consumers from removing labels from items they have purchased. Especially contributing to this confusion was that originally the wording on such labels did not contain the phrase except by consumer.
