= Orthopedic mattress =

Mattress designed to support the body

An orthopedic mattress (or orthopaedic mattress) is a mattress designed to support the joints, back and overall body. The product is informed by the medical study of orthopaedics which focuses on disorders or deformities of the spine and joints. Orthopaedic mattresses have been created to combat the problems one might experience with a bad back or joints by providing a firm mattress which offers targeted, tailored support.

== History and regulations ==
With medical innovations and discoveries regarding bone and joint function in the 1950s, many manufacturers of mattresses made an effort to improve their products and give them an edge over their competitors. However, since there has not been a government standard or official designation that will qualify one mattress to be orthopaedic over others in most countries, and all modern mattresses support the back and joints to a lesser or greater extent, the modern use of the term "orthopaedic" has largely become a marketing term. Mattress manufacturers, in all countries, are not required by law to provide proof of testing to support claims of a mattress being orthopaedic.

== Manufacturers and brands ==
- Duroflex, maker of Duropedic, a certified orthopedic mattress range in India
- Petsmart, Top Paw orthopedic mattress
