= Bed size =

Dimensions of sleeping mattresses

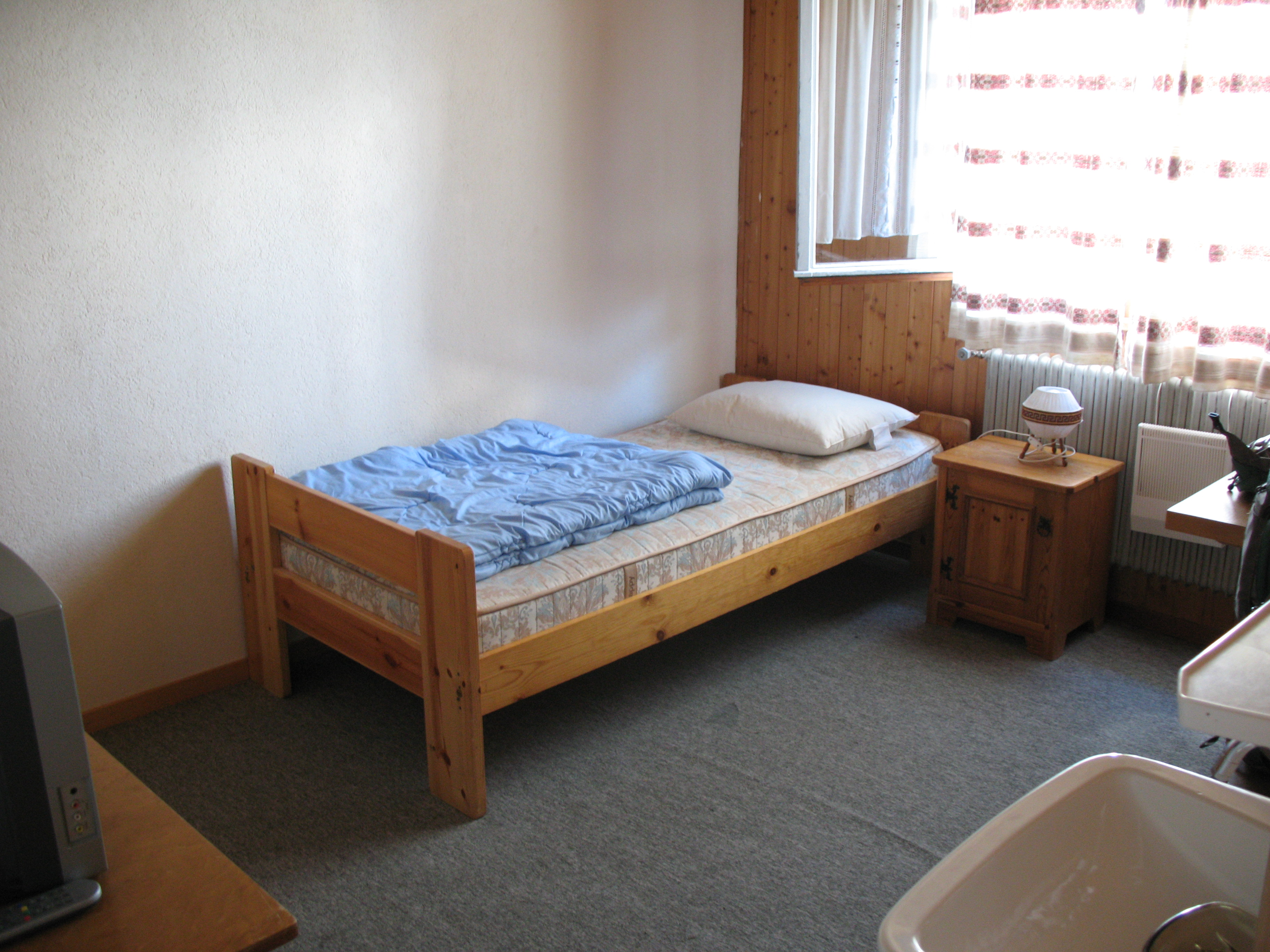
Single-size beds are usually intended for one person.

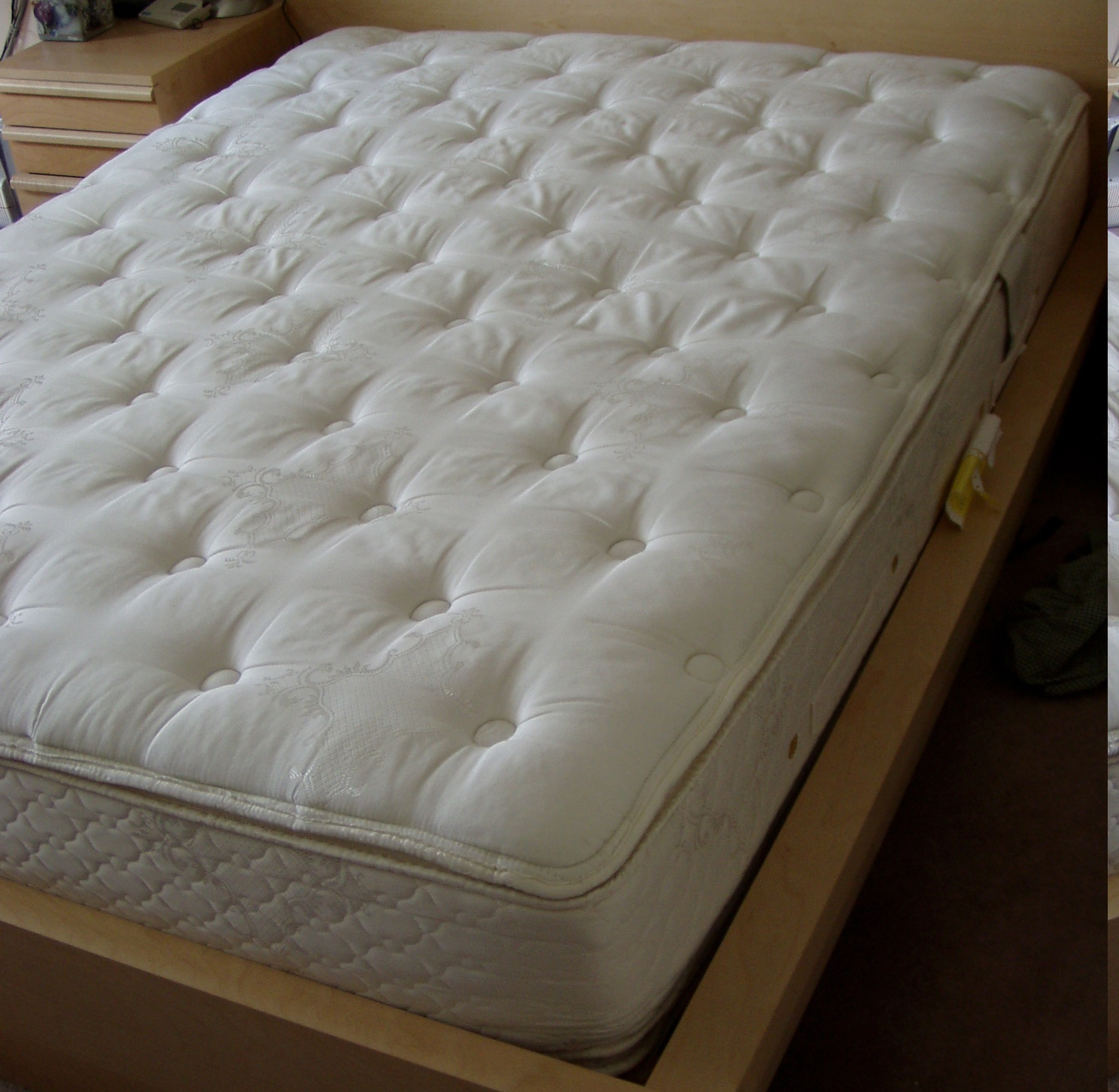
Double-size beds are usually intended for two people.

Standard bed sizes are based on mattress dimensions, which vary from country to country. Bed sizes may also vary depending on the design and ornamentation of the bed frame. Dimensions and terminology differ worldwide, as most countries maintain their own standards. In addition, two mattresses with the same nominal size may have slightly different dimensions due to manufacturing tolerances, padding, and support type. Mattress and bedding sizes may not always correspond.

== Nomenclature ==
Naming standards on different bed sizes and their corresponding actual measurements can vary across national standards. Examples of such nomenclature are names like "single", "full" or "double", "queen" or "king" size. Sometimes the naming standards are further divided by adding adjectives such as "narrow", "long", "extra long", "wide", "extra wide", and so on, which also can vary across national standards.

For example, a king size bed may measure (in width by length):

- 152 cm × 198 cm (60 in × 78 in) in the UK
- 165 cm × 203 cm (65 in × 80 in) in New Zealand
- 180 cm × 190 cm (71 in × 75 in) in Portugal, but is also available in 195 and 200 cm (77 and 79 in) lengths
- 180 cm × 200 cm (71 in × 79 in) in Indonesia
- 183 cm × 191 cm (72 in × 75 in) in Singapore and Malaysia
- 183 cm × 203 cm (72 in × 80 in) in Australia
- 183 cm × 216 cm (72 in × 85 in) in India
- 193 cm × 202 cm (76 in × 80 in) in the US.

Because of the growth of international trade and the above potential cause of confusion, bed sizes are becoming more standardized. In most countries, using the International System of Units, bed dimensions most often appear in centimeters, and often only by width and length. In the United States, Canada and other regions influenced by the former British Empire, dimensions are often in inches.

== Africa ==
=== South Africa ===
In South Africa, bed sizes have standard lengths of either 188 or 200 cm (74 or 79 in), with the latter being called "XL" variants. XL mattresses have the same widths as their non-XL counterparts. The 200 cm (79 in) XL length is recommended for persons over 183 cm (6 ft) tall.

- Single: 92 cm (36 in) wide
- Three-quarter: 107 cm (42 in) wide
- Double: 137 cm (54 in) wide
- Queen: 152 cm (60 in) wide
- King: 183 cm (72 in) wide. Equal to the width of two single mattresses.
- Super king: 200 cm (79 in) wide. Available in XL length only.

== Europe ==
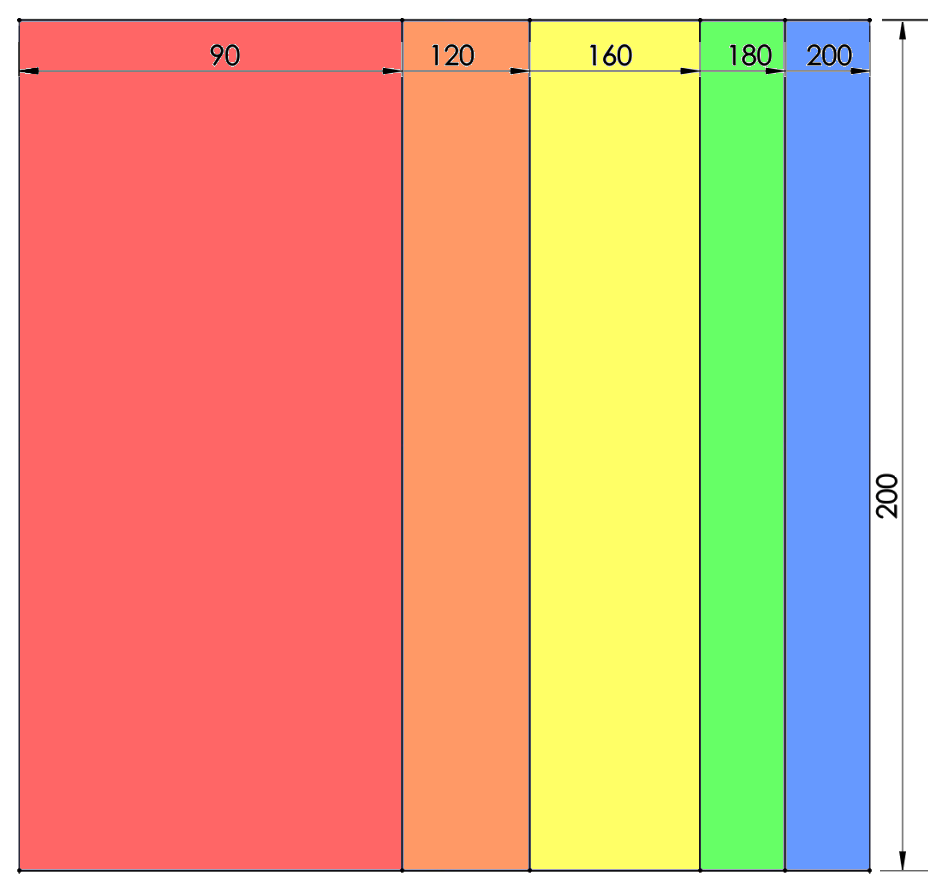
Comparison diagram of some of the most common European single and double bed sizes.

Europe may traditionally have had more variations in national bed size standards than any other part of the world, but in the recent years a few sizes have become more common than others. Bed sizes are defined in centimeters in all European countries, although supplementary Imperial equivalents are sometimes shown in the United Kingdom.

Today, the most common widths sold by pan-European retailers are:

- 90, 100 and 120 cm (35, 39 and 47 in) for single beds.
- 160, 180 and 200 cm (63, 71 and 79 in) for double beds.

Other sizes are also available in some European countries (e.g., 80 or 140 cm (31 or 55 in)), but the widths listed above are the most common when looking at the European market as a whole, while 135 cm (53 in) and 150 cm (59 in) (nominal) are more typical in the UK and Ireland.

Today, the 200 cm (79 in) length is the most common bed length sold by pan-European retailers. Lengths of 210 or 220 cm (83 or 87 in) are often also available by special order. The longer beds are intended for taller people, and as a rule of thumb 210-centimeter-long (83 in) beds may be recommended for people 190 cm (75 in) or taller, while 220 cm (87 in) beds are recommended for people over 200 cm (79 in) tall.

=== France ===
In France, single size beds are usually:

- 90 cm × 190 cm (35 in × 75 in)
- or 90 cm × 200 cm (35 in × 79 in).

The most common sizes for double beds are:

- Valet size 140 cm × 190 cm (55 in × 75 in)
- Queen size 160 cm × 200 cm (63 in × 79 in)
- King size 180 cm × 200 cm (71 in × 79 in)

=== Italy ===
In Italy, beds are classified by name and use the term piazza as in "place". Standard sizes are:

- una piazza (literally "one place") or singolo ("single"): 80 cm × 190 cm (31 in × 75 in) and 90 cm × 190 cm (35 in × 75 in)
- una piazza e mezza (literally "1 1/2 places") or letto da prete (literally "priest's bed"): 120 cm × 190 cm (47 in × 75 in)
- piazza e mezza francese (literally "French 1 1/2 places"): 140 cm × 190 cm (55 in × 75 in)
- due piazze (double, literally "two places") or letto matrimoniale (literally "matrimonial bed"): 160 cm × 190 cm (63 in × 75 in) and 180 cm × 190 cm (71 in × 75 in)

=== Netherlands ===
Sizes listed refer to mattress sizes.

- Single:
  - 80 cm × 200 cm (31 in × 79 in), small single bed.
  - 90 cm × 200 cm (35 in × 79 in), average single bed.
  - 90 cm × 210 cm (35 in × 83 in), tall, average single bed.
  - 90 cm × 220 cm (35 in × 87 in), extra tall, average single bed.
  - 100 cm × 200 cm (39 in × 79 in), large single bed.
  - 100 cm × 210 cm (39 in × 83 in), tall, large single bed.
  - 100 cm × 220 cm (39 in × 87 in), extra tall, large single bed.
- Double:
  - 120 cm × 200 cm (47 in × 79 in), small double bed (twijfelaar).
  - 140 cm × 200 cm (55 in × 79 in), average double bed.
  - 160 cm × 200 cm (63 in × 79 in), large double bed.
  - 160 cm × 210 cm (63 in × 83 in), tall, large double bed.
  - 160 cm × 220 cm (63 in × 87 in), extra tall, large double bed.
  - 180 cm × 200 cm (71 in × 79 in), extra large double bed (lits jumeaux).
  - 180 cm × 210 cm (71 in × 83 in), tall, extra large double bed.
  - 180 cm × 220 cm (71 in × 87 in), extra tall, extra large double bed.
  - 200 cm × 200 cm (79 in × 79 in), extra wide double bed.
  - 200 cm × 210 cm (79 in × 83 in), tall, extra wide double bed.
  - 200 cm × 220 cm (79 in × 87 in), extra tall, extra wide double bed.

=== Northern Europe ===
These sizes are for Austria, Switzerland, Liechtenstein, Germany, Poland, Belgium, Luxembourg, Norway, Sweden, Denmark, Iceland, Finland, Estonia, Latvia, and Lithuania. There are some variations between different countries, but these are the most common sizes. Until the 1980s the most common mattress length was 190 cm (75 in).

- Single:
  - 70 cm × 200 cm (28 in × 79 in), uncommon, mainly for double beds with two separate mattresses.
  - 80 cm × 200 cm (31 in × 79 in), mainly for young people's beds/ bunk beds and double beds with two separate mattresses.
  - 90 cm × 200 cm (35 in × 79 in), common single bed. Extended variants are typically 210 cm (83 in).
  - 100 cm × 200 cm (39 in × 79 in), larger single bed size.
  - 120 cm × 200 cm (47 in × 79 in), uncommon, mainly for teen beds.
- Small double:
  - 140 cm × 200 cm (55 in × 79 in), common, especially among young people and/or single households.
- Double:
  - 160 cm × 200 cm (63 in × 79 in), common, often with two separate mattresses.
  - 180 cm × 200 cm (71 in × 79 in), most common double bed, often with two separate mattresses.
  - 200 cm × 200 cm (79 in × 79 in), a common extra-wide bed, often with two separate mattresses.
  - 210 cm × 210 cm (83 in × 83 in), a common extra-wide bed, often with two separate mattresses.

=== Portugal ===
In Portugal, the most common widths for beds are:

- solteiro (single): 80 cm (31 in) or 90 cm (35 in)
- casal (double): 140 cm (55 in)
- Queen size: 160 cm (63 in)
- King size: 180 cm (71 in)
- Super king size: 200 cm (79 in)

Beds are typically 190 cm (75 in) or 195 cm (77 in) long, but 200 cm (79 in) have become more common.

=== Spain ===
In Spain, standardized lengths are 180, 190 and 200 cm (71, 75 and 79 in), with 190 cm (75 in) being the most common. Standardized widths are 80, 90, 105, 120, 135, 150 or 180 cm (31, 35, 41, 47, 53, 59 or 71 in). The most common bed sizes are:

- individual (single): 90 cm (35 in)
- matrimonio (Spanish) or matrimoni (Catalan) (double, literally "matrimonial"): 135 or 150 cm (53 or 59 in)

=== Turkey ===
In Turkey, single size beds are usually 90 cm × 190 cm (35 in × 75 in); long single size 90 cm × 200 cm (35 in × 79 in); large single size 100 cm × 200 cm (39 in × 79 in).

There is also an intermediate size used for one and a half people in Turkey: 120 cm × 200 cm (47 in × 79 in).

The most common sizes for double beds are: small double size 140 cm × 190 cm (55 in × 75 in); young size 140 cm × 200 cm (55 in × 79 in); double size 150 cm × 200 cm (59 in × 79 in); double size 160 cm × 200 cm (63 in × 79 in); double large size 180 cm × 200 cm (71 in × 79 in); double XL size 200 cm × 200 cm (79 in × 79 in).

=== UK and Ireland ===
Customary UK and Ireland sizes

In the United Kingdom and Ireland, beds are measured according to the size of mattress they hold, not the dimensions of the bed frame itself; bed frame sizes are not standardized and may differ between manufacturers. Listed below are the typical bed sizes from the National Bed Federation, which is the trade association for the majority of British and Irish bed manufacturers and their suppliers. Most NBF manufacturers use designs dimensioned in feet and inches with the metric indicators not being exact equivalents. There can legally be a tolerance of up to ±2 cm (0.8 in) between the quoted measurements and the size of the mattress itself.

Standard bed sizes in UK and Ireland
Size	Dimensions		
Size	Feet and inches	Centimeters	Inches
Small single	2ft 6in × 6ft 3in	76 × 191	30 × 75
Single	3ft 0in × 6ft 3in	91 × 191	36 × 75
Small double*	4ft 0in × 6ft 3in	122 × 191	48 × 75
Double	4ft 6in × 6ft 3in	137 × 191	54 × 75
King	5ft 0in × 6ft 6in	152 × 198	60 × 78
Super king	6ft 0in × 6ft 6in	183 × 198	72 × 78

*Also known as a "three-quarter" or "four-foot" bed.

Some UK retailers may have a "queen" size which refers to one of the above standard sizes, but there is inconsistency around which size specifically, with both the small double and super king being prevalent.

As well as customary UK sizes, some common European sizes can be found in the UK from imports and IKEA. The typical length of an IKEA and other European mattresses is 200 cm (79 in), whereas UK lengths vary depending on the width of the mattress, being usually either 191 or 198 cm (75 or 78 in). In 2015, IKEA started offering beds and mattresses in customary UK sizes alongside their standard European sizes.

Adjustable beds or electric adjustable bed sizes differ from the standard bed size. The length of these beds differs from a standard size because the beds need to bend. So they are 200 centimetres (79 in) in length rather than 191 centimetres (75 in). King size and super king size are normally two 75 centimetres (30 in) or two 90 centimetres (35 in) adjacent beds.

== Asia ==
=== China ===
In China, the following sizes are standard:

- Lengths: 190, 195, 200, 210 cm (75, 77, 79, 83 in)
- Single bed widths: 80, 90, 100, 110, 120 cm (31, 35, 39, 43, 47 in)
- Double bed widths: 135, 140, 150, 180 cm (53, 55, 59, 71 in)

In practice, bed sizes are usually categorized by the width. The length is typically 200 cm (79 in), but this may vary. The most common sizes are:

- 120 cm × 200 cm (47 in × 79 in)
- 150 cm × 200 cm (59 in × 79 in)
- 180 cm × 200 cm (71 in × 79 in)

Other bed sizes are available, which are less common however.

=== Indonesia ===
In Indonesia, the standard length is always 200 cm (79 in). The following market-standard sizes are commonly available in Indonesia:

Single
90 cm × 200 cm (35 in × 79 in)
Double or twin
120 cm × 200 cm (47 in × 79 in)
Queen
160 cm × 200 cm (63 in × 79 in)
King
180 cm × 200 cm (71 in × 79 in)
Super king
200 cm × 200 cm (79 in × 79 in)

=== Japan ===
Standard Japanese bedding sizes are described in the standard JIS S 1102:2017 Beds for domestic use by the Japanese Standards Association.

Standard bed sizes in Japan
Size	Dimensions	
Size	Centimeters	Inches
Single	97 × 195	38 × 77
Semi-double	122 × 195	48 × 77
Double	140 × 195	55 × 77
Wide double	152 × 195	60 × 77
Queen	160 × 195	63 × 77
King	194 × 195	76 × 77
King long	194 × 205	76 × 81

=== Malaysia ===
Standard bed sizes in Malaysia:

Standard bed sizes in Malaysia
Size	Dimensions	
Size	Centimeters	Inches
Single	91 × 191	36 × 75
Super single	107 × 191	42 × 75
Queen	152 × 191	60 × 75
King	183 × 191	72 × 75

=== Pakistan ===
Standard bed sizes in Pakistan include single, queen 1, queen 2, and king.

- Single: 107 cm × 198 cm (42 in × 78 in)
- Queen 1: 152 cm × 198 cm (60 in × 78 in)
- Queen 2: 168 cm × 198 cm (66 in × 78 in)
- King: 183 cm × 198 cm (72 in × 78 in)

=== Singapore ===
Standard bed sizes in Singapore

Standard bed sizes in Singapore
Size	Dimensions	
Size	Centimeters	Inches
Single	91 × 190	36 × 75
Super single	107 × 190	42 × 75
Queen	152 × 190	60 × 75
King	183 × 190	72 × 75

=== Taiwan ===
There are five common bed sizes in Taiwan, locally known as 3-footer, 3.5-footer, 5-footer, 6-footer and 7-footer. They are also known as Taiwanese small single, twin, full, queen and king respectively.

Standard bed sizes in Taiwan
Size	Dimensions	
Size	Centimeters	Inches
Small single	91 × 188	36 × 74
Twin	106 × 188	42 × 74
Double	152 × 188	60 × 74
Queen	182 × 188	72 × 74
King	182 × 212	72 × 83

However, American beds are also popular in Taiwan. Bedroom furniture and bedding of US standard sizes can be purchased in major cities there. In addition, American sizes also include the 3/4-size bed of 48 x 75.

== Oceania ==
=== Australia ===
The following bed sizes are available in Australia.

Traditional Australian bed sizes

Standard bed sizes in Australia
Size	Dimensions	
Size	Centimeters	Inches
Single	92 × 188	36 × 74
Long single	92 × 203	36 × 80
King single	107 × 203	42 × 80
Double	138 × 188	54 × 74
Queen	153 × 203	60 × 80
King	183 × 203	72 × 80
Super king	204 × 204	80 × 80

=== New Zealand ===
The following bed sizes are available in New Zealand.

Standard bed sizes in New Zealand
Size	Dimensions	
Size	Centimeters	Inches
Single	92 × 188	36 × 74
Single XL	92 × 203	36 × 80
King single	107 × 203	42 × 80
Double	135 × 188	53 × 74
Queen	150 × 203	59 × 80
King	165 × 203	65 × 80
Super king	183 × 203	72 × 80
California king	203 × 203	80 × 80

== North America ==
Standard North American bed sizes

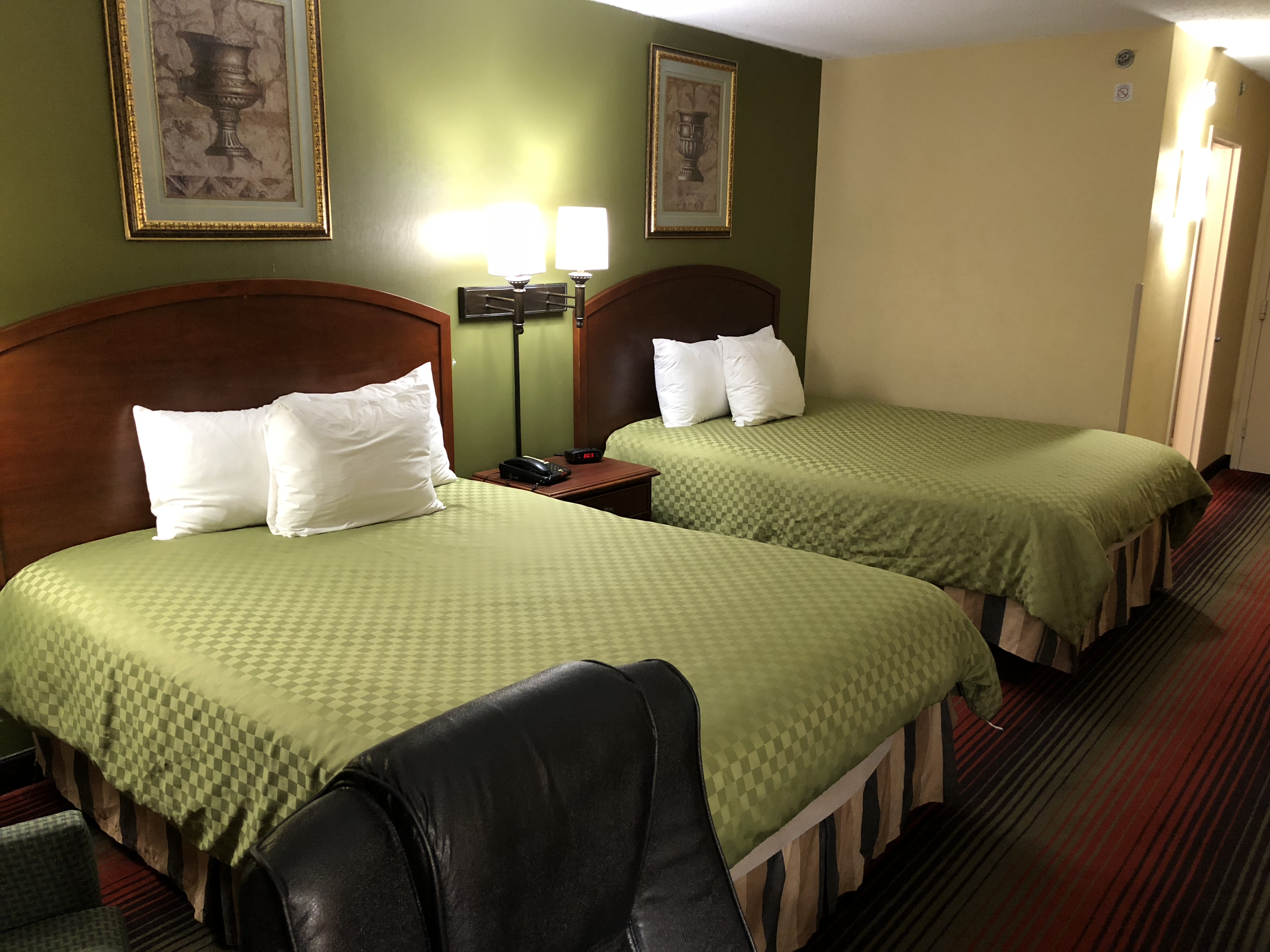
An American hotel room with two queen-size beds

The sizes of mattresses use non-numeric labels such as "king" or "full", but are defined in inches. Historically, most beds were "twins" or "doubles", but in the mid-1940s, larger mattresses were introduced by manufacturers. These were later standardized as "queen" and "king", and first made a significant impact on the market in the 1950s and 1960s. Standard mattress depth ranges from the "standard" size of 9 in (23 cm) to "high contour" of up to 13 in (33 cm). Below are the standard ISPA widths and heights in the United States and Canada.

While the dimensions are specified to the half-inch below, the actual dimensions used by manufacturers or various websites may be half an inch larger or smaller.

Standard bed sizes in North America
Size	Dimensions	
Size	Inches	Centimeters
Twin or single	38.5 × 74.5	98 × 189
Twin XL	38.5 × 79.5	98 × 202
Full or double	53.5 × 74.5	136 × 189
Queen	60 × 79.5	152 × 202
King	76 × 79.5	193 × 202
California king	72 × 83.5	183 × 212

While many furniture websites claim that David Bergeson invented the California king bed size in 1982 in Concord, California, to accommodate his long legs and short arms, the International Sleep Products Association proved that it was developed in the 1920s for Hollywood celebrities, thus predating the standard king bed size.

Less common sizes include:

Less common bed sizes in North America
Size	Dimensions	
Size	Inches	Centimeters
Crib	27.5 × 52	70 × 132
Junior	27.5 × 63	70 × 160
Cot or small single	30 × 75	76 × 191
Antique single	36 × 72	91 × 183
Twin XXL	37.5 × 83.5	95 × 212
Antique double or three-quarter	48 × 72	122 × 183
Full XL or double XL	53.5 × 79.5	136 × 202
Super queen, Olympic queen, or expanded queen	66 × 80	168 × 203
California queen	60 × 83.5	152 × 212
Super king, grand king, athletic king, or Texas king	80 × 98	203 × 249
Wyoming king	84 × 84	213 × 213
Alberta king or Alaskan queen	96 × 96	244 × 244
Alaskan king	108 × 108	274 × 274

There are also a number of specialty sizes for specific use cases. In addition, there are Florida king sizes.

Specialty bed sizes in North America
Size	Dimensions		Use case
Size	Inches	Centimeters	Use case
Half queen or split queen	30 × 79.5	76 × 202	For adjustable queen size beds where each half moves independently.
Half California king or split California king	36 × 83.5	91 × 212	For adjustable California king size beds where each half moves independently.
Short queen or RV queen	60 × 75	152 × 191	Typically found in recreational vehicles and campers
Short king or RV king	72 × 75	183 × 191	Typically found in RVs. Narrower and shorter than a standard king.
RV king	72 × 80	183 × 203	Typically found in RVs. Narrower than a standard king.
Single waterbed	36 × 82	91 × 208	Used for conventional mattress inserts inside a single/twin waterbed frame.
Super single waterbed	47 × 82	119 × 208	Used for conventional waterbed insert inside a super single waterbed frame.
Queen waterbed	58 × 82	147 × 208	Used for conventional waterbed insert inside a queen waterbed frame. (Subtract 2 in (5 cm) from California queen size)
King waterbed	70 × 82	178 × 208	Used for conventional waterbed insert inside a king waterbed frame. (Subtract 2 in (5 cm) from California king size)
Medium family bed	108 × 80	274 × 203	For co-sleeping with multiple partners, children, or pets.
Large family bed	120 × 80	305 × 203	For co-sleeping with multiple partners, children, or pets.
XL family bed	144 × 84	366 × 213	For co-sleeping with multiple partners, children, or pets. Is the same as two California kings side-by-side.
Truck sleeper cab common mattress sizes (without specific names)	32 × 79	81 × 201	Many additional sizes are considered standard for trucks, and custom sizes are available as well.
Truck sleeper cab common mattress sizes (without specific names)	35 × 79	89 × 201	Many additional sizes are considered standard for trucks, and custom sizes are available as well.
Truck sleeper cab common mattress sizes (without specific names)	36 × 76	91 × 193	Many additional sizes are considered standard for trucks, and custom sizes are available as well.
Truck sleeper cab common mattress sizes (without specific names)	38 × 80	97 × 203	Many additional sizes are considered standard for trucks, and custom sizes are available as well.
Truck sleeper cab common mattress sizes (without specific names)	42 × 80	107 × 203	Many additional sizes are considered standard for trucks, and custom sizes are available as well.

Bedding in the United States must state the type of bed it is intended for, in addition to the dimensions in both inches and centimeters.

In addition to the horizontal dimensions of beds, another aspect of bed size is the vertical height of the bed. This is particularly relevant for bunk beds, loft beds, Murphy beds, and canopy beds, which require more vertical space than other beds.

For both bunk beds and loft beds, it is generally recommended that there be at least 40 inches (1 meter) of vertical space between the top of the mattress and the ceiling. This allows the average-sized adult to sit up comfortably in bed.

For vertical Murphy beds that fold up against the wall, the ceiling height must accommodate the full length of the Murphy bed's wall frame.

For canopy beds, there needs to be suitable clearance between the top of the canopy point and the ceiling.

== See also ==
- Bed sheet
- Infant bed
- Toddler bed
