= Sleep Number =

U.S. manufacturing company

Sleep Number Corporation

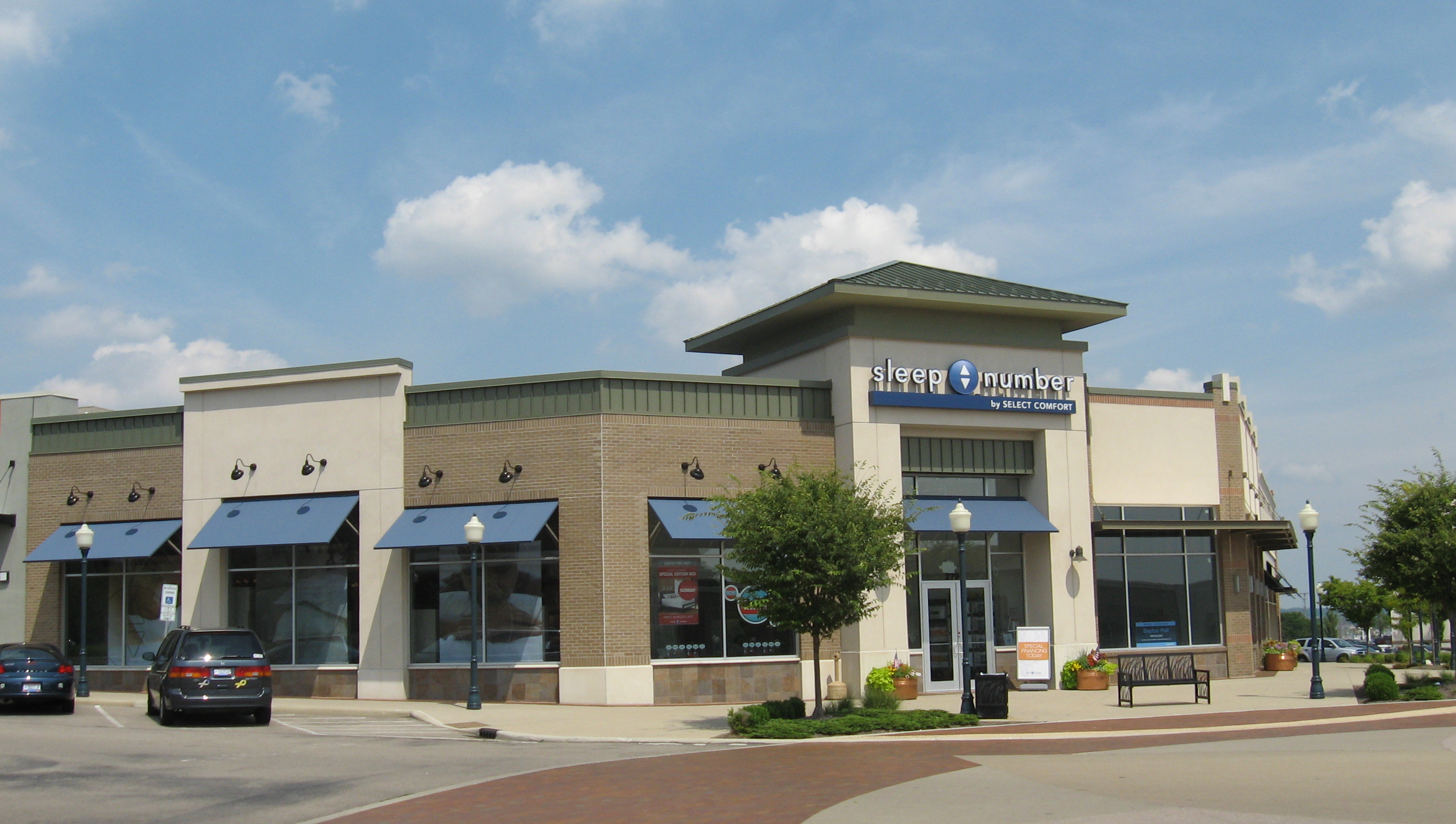
- A "Sleep Number" store in Miamisburg, Ohio
- Formerly: Select Comfort (1987-2017)
- Type: Public
- Traded as: Nasdaq: SNBR
- Industry: Retail
- Founded: 1987; 39 years ago
- Founders: Robert "Bob" Walker; JoAnn Walker
- Headquarters: Minneapolis, Minnesota, U.S.
- Number of locations: 600 (Dec. 2025)
- Area served: United States
- Key people: Linda Findley (CEO)
- Products: Adjustable mattresses and bedding
- Revenue: ▲$1.856 billion (2021)
- Operating income: ▲US$184 million (2021)
- Net income: ▲US$139 million (2021)
- Total equity: ▲US$175 million (2021)
- Number of employees: 5,515 (2023)
- Website: sleepnumber.com

Sleep Number Corporation is an American manufacturer that makes Sleep Number adjustable beds as well as foundations and bedding accessories. The company is based in Minneapolis, Minnesota. In addition to its Minnesota headquarters, Sleep Number has manufacturing and distribution facilities in South Carolina and Utah.

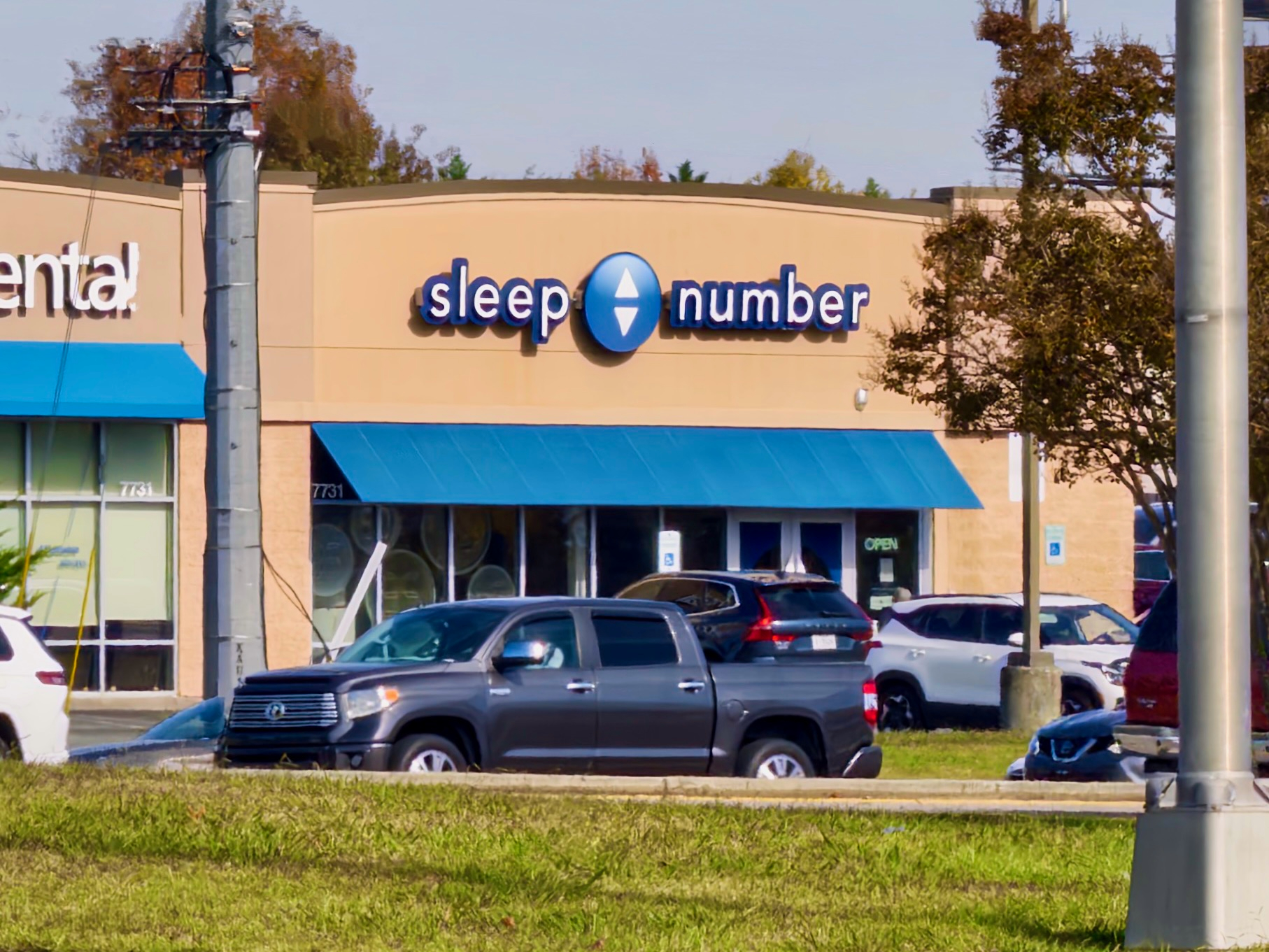
A Sleep Number retail store in Knoxville, Tennessee

== History ==
In 1980, the category of adjustable air-supported sleep systems was invented by a private company, Comfortaire Corporation of South Carolina. Robert Walker left Comfortaire and he and his wife, JoAnne Walker, formed a new company in 1987 called Select Comfort.

Select Comfort acquired the Comfortaire Corporation in January 2013. In March 2017, Select Comfort closed its Comfortaire third-party retail business. In November 2017, Select Comfort Corporation changed their corporate name to Sleep Number Corporation.

As of December 2011, Sleep Number holds 23 issued or pending U.S. patents and 40 issued or pending foreign patents for its products.

In January 2020, Sleep Number announced a collaboration with Mayo Clinic to further sleep science research and cardiovascular medicine, valued at $10M over five years. In February 2022, Sleep Number entered into a long-term partnership with the American Cancer Society to embark upon foundational sleep research to identify the impact of quality sleep on cancer prevention and recovery.

In March 2025, Sleep Number Corporation’s Board of Directors appointed Linda Findley as President and Chief Executive Officer, effective April 7, 2025. She succeeded Shelly Ibach, who had announced her retirement in October 2024 and continued to serve as Board Chair until the expiration of her term at the 2025 annual meeting.

In February 2026, Sleep Number announced a partnership with American football player Travis Kelce, a three-time Super Bowl champion, who also became an investor in the company. As part of the agreement, Kelce purchased common stock on the open market and was granted restricted stock units subject to a three-year vesting period and customary conditions.

In June 2026, Sleep Number entered into an asset purchase agreement with Sleep Country Canada. Following a competitive auction, the bankruptcy court approved the sale of substantially all of the company's assets and ongoing business operations to SNBR Inc., a wholly owned subsidiary of Sleep Country Canada, on July 20, 2026. Sleep Country announced the completion of the acquisition on July 31, 2026, and stated that the combined business operated more than 800 retail locations across Canada and the United States.

== Sleep Number Bed ==
The company manufactures the Sleep Number bed, an adjustable air mattress. The "Sleep Number" is a setting that adjusts the firmness or softness of the mattress on each side of the bed using air pressure. Higher numbers (up to 100) denote higher pressure and more firmness, and lower numbers denoting less pressure and more softness.

== Legal issues and controversy ==
In 2005, Sleepy's, which is now Mattress Firm, sued Select Comfort, currently known as Sleep Number, for disparaging the quality and comfort of Personal Preference beds made by Sleepy's, and said Sleepy’s offered inferior warranties. The case revolved around whether or not Select Comfort violated a 2005 contract that let Sleepy’s sell a Select Comfort product, while Select Comfort sold an arguably superior product in its own stores. The case was originally dismissed in 2015 by U.S. District Judge Joanna Seybert in Central Islip, New York but later revived by the 2nd U.S. Circuit Court of Appeals in 2018 after finding out that the lower court misinterpreted part of the New York law. The appeals court also threw out a $2.63 million legal fee award for Sleep Number.

In 2015, a class action lawsuit was filed against Sleep Number and Leggett & Platt accusing the companies of failing to uphold the warranty and fix a bed they sold to customers, David and Katina Spade. The suit claims there were several other customers who experienced similar issues.

On November 9, 2019 Dires LLC, the legal entity that sells the Personal Comfort Bed, filed a lawsuit in Minnesota state court accusing Sleep Number of monopolization, tortious interference, deceptive trade and unjust enrichment. This stems out of a previous court ruling stating that Sleep Number has no trademark rights to the phrase “number bed.” The new lawsuit claims that Sleep Number falsely told Google that it owns the trademark rights for "number bed," causing Google to deny Dires the use of the phrase to attain more clicks to its website. Dires also accused Sleep Number of targeting it with false, misleading and defamatory reviews and comments about its products. They provided evidence of Sleep Number employees posting false and negative comments about its products on Facebook and YouTube.
