= International Sleep Products Association =

Mattress industry trade association

- Founded: 1915
- Type: Advocacy
- Purpose: Mattress Industry Advocacy
- Location: Alexandria, Virginia, United States
- Key people: Ryan Trainer, President; Chair Scott Tinsley, Board of Trustees
- Website: www.sleepproducts.org
- Formerly called: National Association of Mattress Manufacturers; National Association of Bedding Manufacturers

The International Sleep Products Association (ISPA) is a trade association based in Alexandria, Virginia, United States. ISPA members are global mattress manufacturers and suppliers and the association works to lead and advance the interests of the sleep products industry on a range of commercial, health, safety and environmental issues, including legislative lobbying at the state and federal level.

== History ==
Founded as the National Association of Mattress Manufacturers in 1915, the organization renamed itself two years later as the National Association of Bedding Manufacturers. Its goal was to create state tagging laws (see law label) and address the health sanitation issues affecting consumers. The association's name was changed to the International Sleep Products Association (ISPA) in 1987 to reflect acceptance of international members. ISPA publishes the Manual of Labeling Laws annually along with several other industry data reports.

== Support and services ==
The association's products and services to members and non-members include:

- Industry news publications
- Networking opportunities
- Mattress industry advocacy
- Industry education and events
- Other tools and publications for members
- Consumer outreach and research via the Better Sleep Council
- Mattress industry statistical information and market intelligence
- An online ISPA Job Board, which assists member companies in filling job openings
- Services and information designed to assist industry members in reducing bottom-line expenses

ISPA provides regular and member communications through its website, through its publications BedTimes and Sleep Savvy and their websites, and through a range of social media including Facebook, LinkedIn, Twitter and its Blog - Bedpost.

BedTimes magazine, published monthly, covers mattress industry news for manufacturers and components suppliers. In August 2017, BedTimes marked 100 years of continuous publication with a celebratory feature chock full of industry history and interesting anecdotes.

The BedTimes Supplies Guide is a listing of products and services used in mattress and other sleep products manufacturing.

Sleep Savvy magazine is targeted to mattress retailers. Editorial content centers on tools and information to assist in boosting mattress sales.

ISPA Insider, a weekly industry e-newsletter for members, covers association news, legislative and regulatory issues, meetings and trade show information, and breaking news impacting the mattress industry.

== Better Sleep Council (BSC) ==
Founded by ISPA in 1979, the BSC's stated goal has been to increase mattress sales and shorten the mattress replacement cycle by educating consumers about the relationship between sleep, health and quality of life. BSC blogs, spokespersons and social media posts discuss the sleep environment and important contributors to quality sleep.

The BSC funds regular research studies of consumers to explore attitudes toward mattresses and the shopping experience. ISPA membership dues support BSC research and other programs. The BSC aims to keep consumers informed about mattresses and sleep, especially when shopping.

Better Sleep Month is recognized and celebrated by the Better Sleep Council each May.

The BSC has conducted several studies on consumer shopping behavior and the typical mattress replacement cycle. The council takes credit for helping reduce the average mattress replacement cycle from 13-plus years to about 10 years. The BSC sponsored a groundbreaking study conducted by the Oklahoma State University to scientifically evaluate whether a new mattress improves sleep quality and efficiency, while reducing back, spine, shoulder and neck stiffness, thus leading to a more restful night’s sleep. The results were positive. This study is a resource for the BSC’s consumer messaging.

== Mattress Recycling Council (MRC) ==
The Mattress Recycling Council is a nonprofit organization that ISPA established in 2014 to operate recycling programs in states that have passed mattress recycling laws: California, Connecticut, Rhode Island and Oregon. MRC recycles nearly 2 million mattresses each year. Learn more on the MRC website.
