= Marshall coil =

Component of a mattress

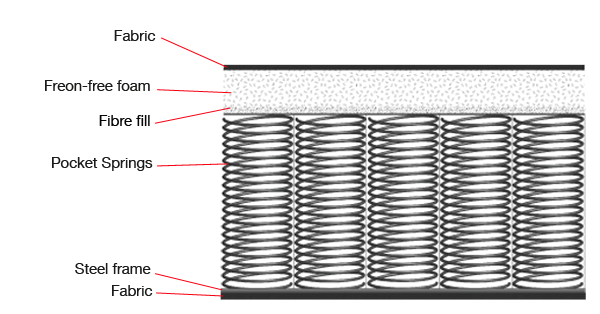
Pocket coil mattress construction

Marshall coils, also known as encased coils or encased springs (more commonly known in North America as pocketed springs or pocket coils), are component parts of a mattress in which each coil is separately wrapped in a textile material.

== History ==
Marshall coils were invented in 1899 by Canadian-born James Marshall, a machinist and engineer who was born near Haldimand, Ontario, Canada. He received a Canadian patent in 1900, and United States and United Kingdom patents in 1902. Marshall established the original Marshall Mattress company in Toronto, Canada, which continued to operate for over 119 years. He also licensed patent rights for the United Kingdom to his former employees; that company operated under the name of Marshall Sanitary Mattress Company until the early 1930s, when they changed their name to VI-Spring. In January 2019, the Flex Group acquired the (Canadian) Marshall Mattress Company from then-owners, the Warner family, to continue manufacturing handcrafted mattresses.

== Concept ==
Marshall conceived of a mattress whereby internal independent springs would provide both support and comfort within the mattress itself. Marshall produced pre-compressed cylindrical coil springs, each sewn inside an individual cotton fabric pocket, which provided uplifting support on its own. When fitted together, the coils became an independent suspension system that contoured to each person's form and weight, providing unsurpassed support and comfort. When upholstered, a finished Marshall mattress aims to reduce physical pressure under the sleeper, and claims to relieve it as well. Marshall's pocket spring-filled mattress system became the original worldwide standard for spring-filled mattress construction.
