= Simmons Bedding Company =

American mattress manufacturer

- Type: Private
- Industry: Beds
- Founded: 1870
- Founder: Zalmon G. Simmons
- Defunct: September 14, 2025; 12 months ago
- Headquarters: Atlanta, Georgia, United States
- Products: Mattresses
- Brands: Simmons; BeautyRest; BeautySleep
- Parent: Serta Simmons Bedding, LLC
- Website: simmons.com

The Simmons Bedding Company is an American major manufacturer of mattresses and related bedding products, based in Atlanta, Georgia. The company was founded in 1870. Simmons' flagship brand is Beautyrest. In addition to operating 18 manufacturing facilities in the United States and Puerto Rico, the company licenses its products internationally.

In 2011, Simmons ranked in third place among U.S. mattress manufacturers, with a 15.7 percent market share. In 2012, Simmons and its sister company Serta International were acquired by American private equity company Advent International. As of 2022, Simmons is a subsidiary of the American company Serta Simmons Bedding, LLC of Doraville, Georgia. On January 23, 2023, Serta Simmons Bedding filed for Chapter 11. The company successfully completed its financial restructuring and emerged from Chapter 11 on June 29, 2023, continuing to operate normally.

Beyond the United States, the Simmons brand operates internationally through licensing agreements, and continues to expand in multiple countries

== History ==
=== Early history ===
In 1870, Zalmon G. Simmons opened his first factory in Kenosha, Wisconsin. He started out by manufacturing wooden telegraph insulators and cheese boxes. He branched into making bedsprings after receiving a patent for a woven-wire bedspring in payment of a debt. In 1876, Simmons became the first manufacturer to mass-produce woven wire mattresses. By 1889, with the introduction of spiral coil springs into woven mattresses, Simmons' mattress prices dropped from $12 to 95 cents. The business was incorporated in 1884 as the Northwestern Wire Mattress Company, adopting Simmons Manufacturing Company as its name in 1889.

=== National business ===
Zalmon Simmons Jr., who took charge of the business after his father's death in 1910, oversaw additional growth. In 1916, Simmons began advertising nationally, initiating its first national advertising campaign with a double-spread ad in the Saturday Evening Post.

By 1919, growth was fast. In response, Simmons acquired manufacturing plants in San Francisco, California; Los Angeles, California; Montreal, Quebec; Toronto, Ontario; Winnipeg, Manitoba; Vancouver, British Columbia; Elizabeth, New Jersey; Seattle, Washington; and Atlanta, Georgia. The following year, Simmons started a new sales arrangement. Instead of purchasing a mattress directly off the retail floor, customers could test the product on in-store samples, order a mattress through the retailer, and receive direct delivery within the next 24 hours from one of Simmons' 64 warehouses. This arrangement reduced the need for retailers to own and store their own product inventories. In 1923, Simmons moved its corporate headquarters to New York City.

Equipment developed by Simmons in 1925 automated the process of coiling wire and inserting it into fabric sleeves, called encasements. This allowed mass production of pocketed coils, a type of coil that had been available only in very high-priced luxury mattresses. The pocketed coil is the basis for the Simmons Beautyrest mattress brand, which was introduced in 1925. Although the new manufacturing technology greatly reduced its cost, at the time of its introduction a Beautyrest mattress sold for $39.50, three to four times more than the typical price for a standard wire mattress. Simmons promoted its products aggressively with ads that included testimonials from famous people such as Eleanor Roosevelt in 1927 and Henry Ford, H. G. Wells, Thomas Edison, Guglielmo Marconi and George Bernard Shaw in 1929. Eleanor Roosevelt continued to promote the brand into the 1930s, through her radio show. Cole Porter mentioned the Simmons brand in the lyrics of his 1934 song "Anything Goes".

In 1940, Simmons introduced the Hide-A-Bed, a sofa that incorporates a fold-out spring and mattress that pull out to form a bed. This became one of the company's best known products and was manufactured until the 1980s. During World War II, Simmons' facilities were diverted to military production, making cots, parachutes, bazooka rockets and other products. By the post-war year of 1947, the company was back in the mattress business and started using advertising to associate its products with the Hollywood glamor of actresses including Dorothy Lamour and Maureen O'Hara. A research and development facility was established in Munster, Indiana, in 1957, building upon pioneering studies on human sleep behavior that Simmons had sponsored in the 1930s. In 1958, the company became the first U.S. mattress maker to produce mattresses in king and queen sizes, an innovation that was promoted as solving the "space battle in the bedroom".

=== Era of corporate change ===
In 1975, the Simmons corporate headquarters moved to Atlanta, Georgia. Shortly thereafter, the company research and development team also relocated to Georgia, to a building in what is today Peachtree Corners. In 1995, the company's R&D division moved into a new home, the Simmons Institute for Technology and Education (SITE).

Simmons underwent the first in a series of corporate mergers and acquisitions in 1979, when the company was acquired by Gulf and Western Industries. Six years later, Gulf and Western sold Simmons to Wickes Companies. Wesray Capital bought the business in 1986, and sold it to the Simmons employee stock ownership plan in 1989. Merrill Lynch Capital Partners obtained a majority interest in Simmons in 1991, and sold to Investcorp in about 1996. Fenway Partners bought the company about two years later, then sold to Thomas H. Lee Partners in 2003.

In the 1990s, a commercial for the Simmons Beautyrest featured a bowling ball being dropped on a Beautyrest mattress and a standard open-coil mattress to illustrate the company's claim that a person's nighttime movements are less likely to disturb a sleep partner if their mattress is a Beautyrest. The bowling ball demonstration, which was popular with Simmons dealers, consumers, and industry experts, was revived in 2006.

In 2003, Fenway Partners made the Sleep Country USA chain of retail stores a part of Simmons; in 2006, Simmons sold the chain to The Sleep Train of Citrus Heights, California. The following year, the company added memory foam products to its offerings by acquiring the Comfor–Pedic line of memory foam mattresses and pillows from Comfor Products of Kent, Washington.

The company suffered financially under the successive ownership of multiple private equity firms and other private investors. The private equity owners extracted $750 million in profits out of Simmons, while the company's debt increased from $164 million in 1991 to $1.3 billion in 2009. On September 25, 2009, Simmons announced a Chapter 11 restructuring plan and signed a purchase agreement with an investor group led by Ares Management and Ontario Teachers' Pension Plan. The bankruptcy court approved the deal, reducing the company's total debt from about $1 billion to $450 million. The bankruptcy did not include subsidiaries in Canada and Puerto Rico, but those units were included in the deal with Ares Management and the Ontario Teachers' Pension Plan. Ares and the Ontario Teachers' Pension Plan were also the owners of the Serta brand name under National Bedding Company LLC. They operated Serta and Simmons Bedding as independent entities that continued to compete with one another.

On October 2, 2012, private equity firm Advent International acquired a majority interest in AOT Bedding Super Holdings (now Serta Simmons Holdings, LLC), the parent company of Simmons and Serta. Ares Management and the Ontario Teachers' Pension Plan continued to own a "significant" share of company equity. At the time of the Advent acquisition, Simmons and Serta together held a 34 percent share of the U.S. mattress market. Simmons and Serta retained separate sales, marketing, research and development, and merchandising departments, and continue to remain separate.

In August 2018, Simmons Bedding's parent company Serta Simmons Holdings LLC announced a merger with online retailer Tuft & Needle to increase their online presence.

By November 2020, the parent company had established a website to promote its renaming to Serta Simmons Bedding LLC, while still retaining the separate brands it owns (Serta, Simmons, Tuft & Needle and Beautyrest, now spun off from Simmons into a separate brand) and individual websites for them.

On January 23, 2023, Serta Simmons Bedding filed for Chapter 11 bankruptcy.

The company successfully completed its financial restructuring and emerged from Chapter 11 on June 29, 2023, continuing to operate normally.

Beyond the United States, the Simmons brand operates internationally through licensing agreements, and continues to expand in multiple countries, including Asia, Latin America and Brazil.
