= Bunkie board =

Thin mattress support originally for bunk bed

A bunkie board is thin mattress support originally intended for a bunk bed. It was invented in the early 20th century to provide a thinner platform support than box-springs, and more uniform support than slats.

== Construction ==
A DIY bunkie board might consist of 19 mm (3/4 in) plywood, but commercially-made versions can be made of wood or metal, and are often covered in fabric.
