= Box-spring =

Type of bed base

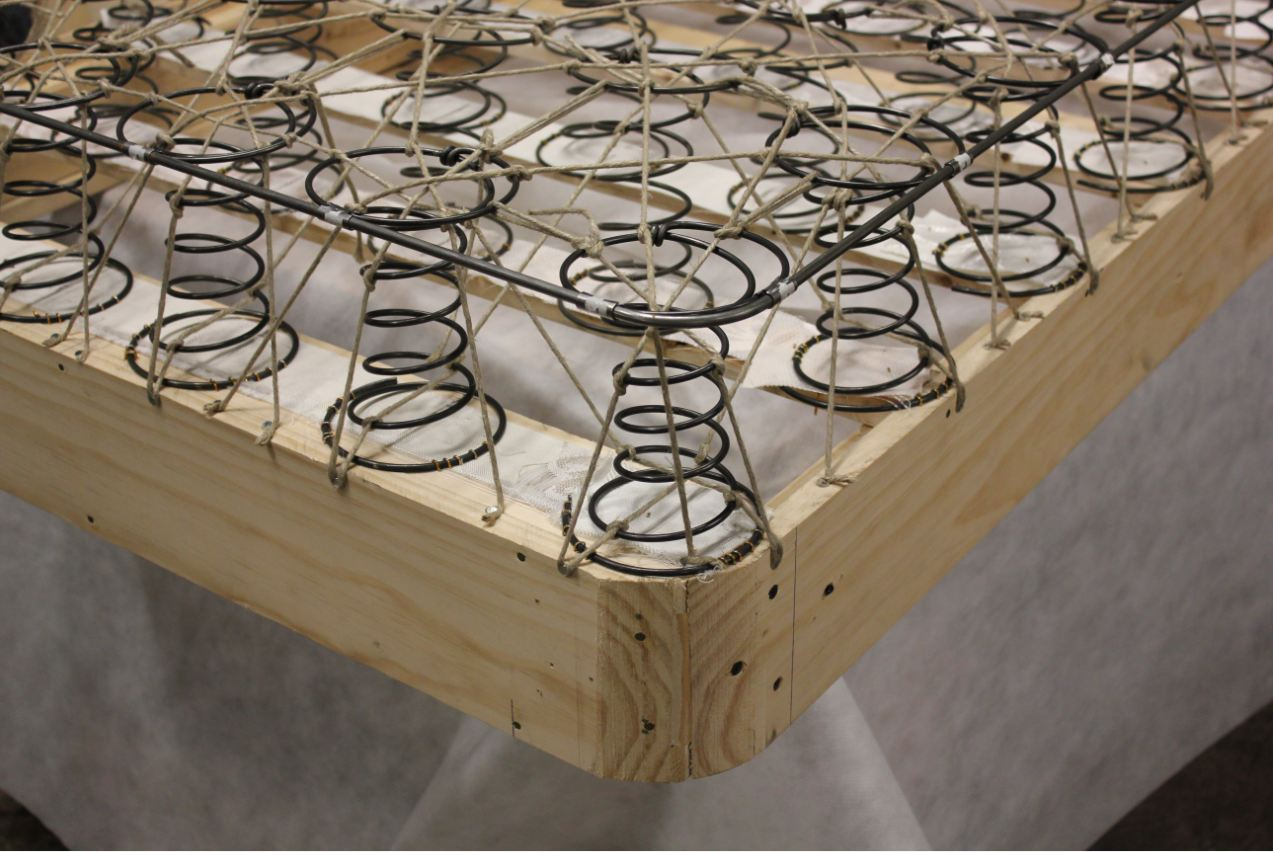
Box-spring

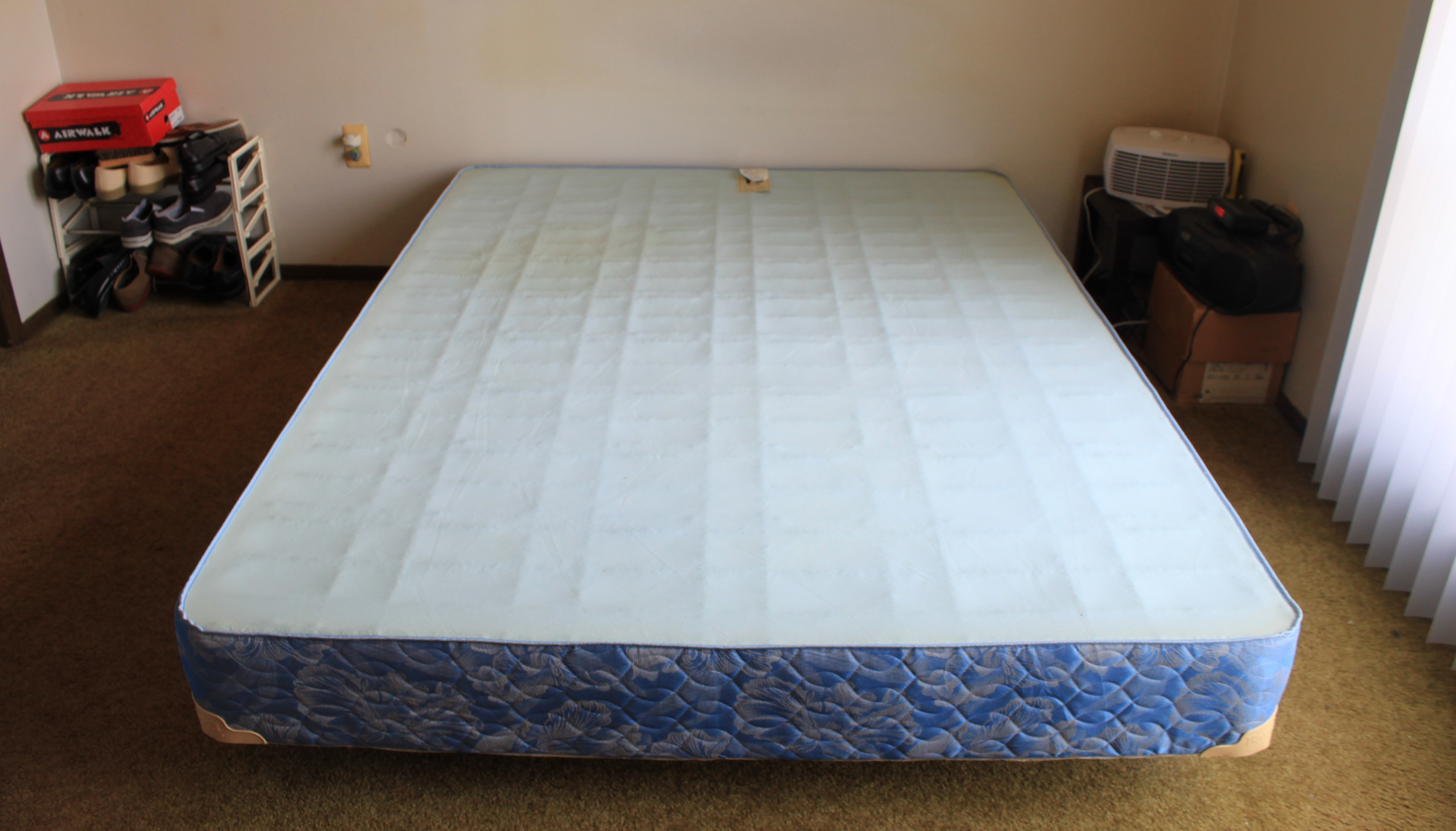
Queen size box-spring on metal bed frame

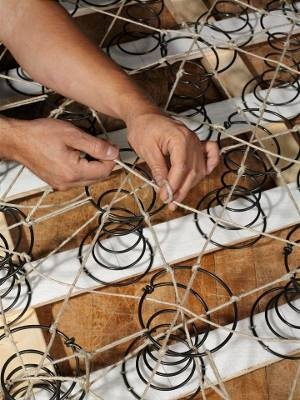
8-way hand-tied box spring

A box-spring (or divan in some countries) is a type of bed base typically consisting of a sturdy wooden frame covered in cloth and containing springs. Usually, the box-spring is placed on top of a wooden or metal bedframe that sits on the floor and acts as a brace, except in the UK where the divan is more often fitted with small casters. The box-spring is usually the same size as the much softer mattress placed on it. Working together, the box-spring and mattress (with an optional bed frame) make up a bed. It is common to find a box-spring and mattress being used together without the support of a frame underneath, the box spring being mounted directly on casters standing on the floor.

== Purpose ==
The purpose of a box-spring mainly lies in the trade-off between ventilating the bed through the bottom and the structural stability of the box-spring itself.

=== Other purposes ===
The box-spring has a variety of advantages and purposes. Purposes include:

- elevating the mattress above the ground, increasing the ease of getting into bed and getting out of bed;
- Providing ventilation and allowing body moisture to escape, reducing the growth of mold and mildew due to moisture retention;
- Creating a relatively flat and firm structure for the mattress to lie upon;
- Enhancing aesthetics or design-style value.

== History ==
The first rectangular spring-cushioned wireframes to support mattresses did not have wood rims or cloth covers. These were called bedsprings. More and more box-springs are made of wood and then covered in fabrics. Wood makes a better support system for the newer memory foam and latex mattresses. The newest design in box-springs is the folding box spring, which is made of wood or metal and then covered in fabric that can fold in half and be sent by shipping and courier companies.

With the increasing height of mattresses, manufacturers now make box springs in different heights so that the mattress and box spring pair maintain a standard height. Standard "high profile" box springs are 9 inches (23 cm) in height, whereas "low profile" box springs are between 5 and 5.5 inches (13 and 14 cm). Changing the thickness of the box spring and mattress requires revisions to the mattress and box spring coil stiffness. This is often why box springs and mattresses are matched and sold in pairs.

== Alternatives ==
Box-spring beds are especially popular in North America and Western Europe.

Alternatively, in Japan, futon mattresses are usually placed on a bedframe or the floor without using springs.

A bunkie board can be used when a low profile is desired.

In Europe, wooden frames with a middle section consisting of springs held in place by wire (to be put into the wooden bedframe as a unit) used to be the standard for most of the 20th century. The springs have mostly been replaced by pre-bent wooden slats (usually glued laminated timber made from beech or birch), which are joined to the outer wooden frame by some form of flexible rubber bolt, shoe or socket. This lath floor provides suspension, allows the mattress to ventilate, and can be designed to be vertically adjustable to elevate the legs or the torso. A more straightforward approach is to join straight laths with a textile strap to be rolled up for transport and placed right into the bedframe.
