= Mattress =

Large soft mat for lying on to sleep

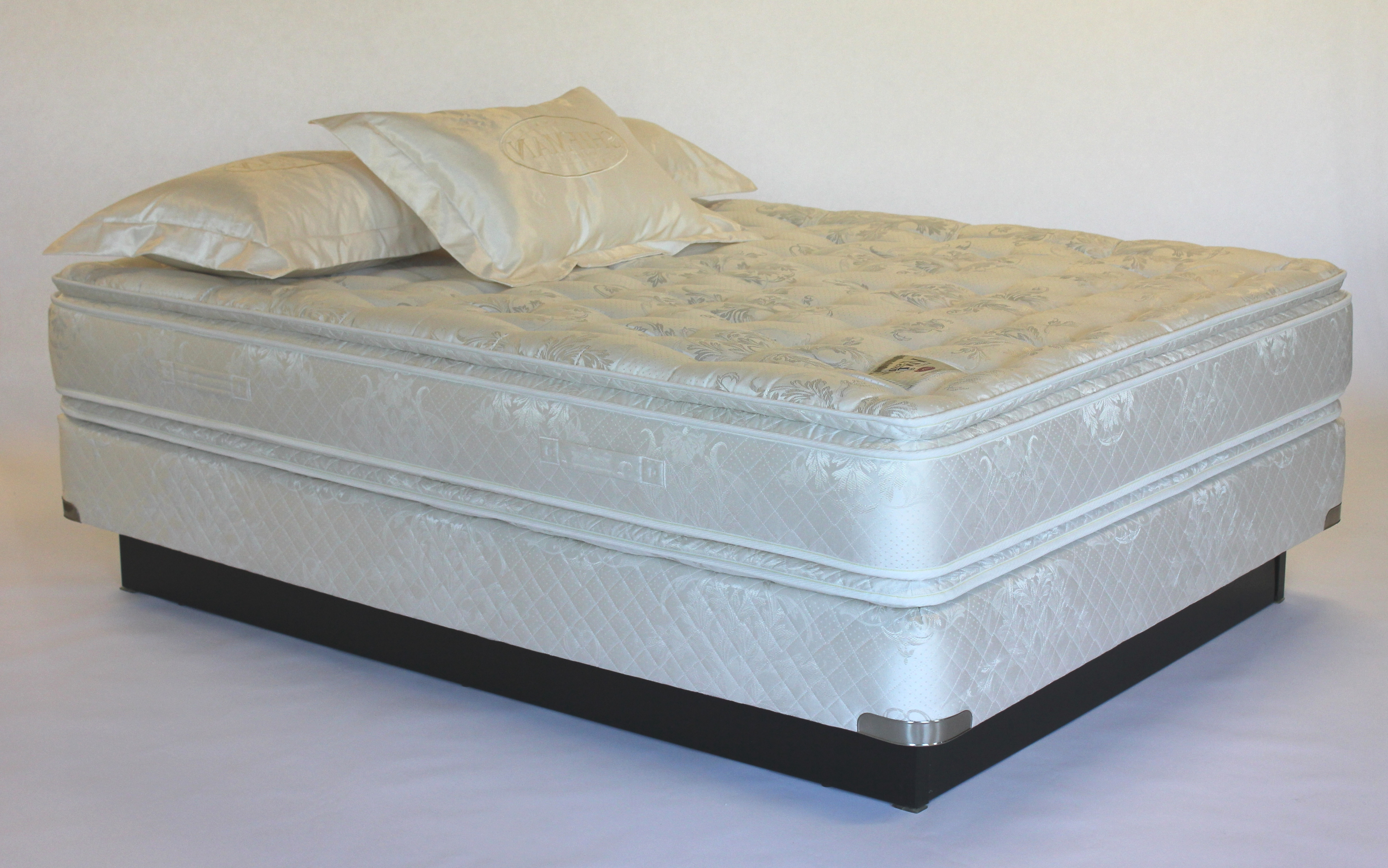
Two-sided, innerspring pillow-top mattress on box-spring foundation with a woven damask cover also called a mattress sheet

A mattress is a large, usually rectangular pad for supporting a person lying down, especially for sleeping. It is designed to be used as a bed, or on a bed frame as part of a bed. Mattresses may consist of a quilted or similarly fastened case, usually of heavy cloth, containing materials such as hair, straw, cotton, foam, rubber, or a framework of metal springs. Mattresses may also be filled with air or water.

Mattresses are usually placed on top of a bed base which may be solid, as in the case of a platform bed, or elastic, such as an upholstered wood and wire box spring or a slatted foundation. Popular in Europe, a divan incorporates both mattress and foundation in a single upholstered, footed unit. Divans have at least one innerspring layer as well as cushioning materials. They may be supplied with a secondary mattress or a removable "topper". Mattresses may also be filled with air or water, or a variety of natural fibers, such as in futons. Kapok is a common mattress material in Southeast Asia, and coir in South Asia.

== History ==
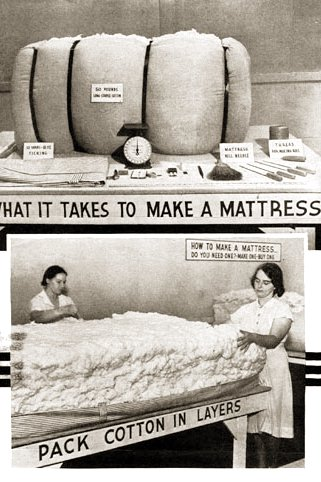
Photo on a 1940 USDA circular promoting home production of cotton mattresses

A third-century BCE papyrus mentions a man named Krotos who is "waiting in Jaffa for an opportunity of exporting... and mattresses."

The word mattress derives from the Arabic مَطْرَحٌ (maṭraḥ) which means "something thrown down" or "place where something is thrown down" and hence "mat, cushion". During the Crusades, Europeans adopted one of the Middle Eastern methods of sleeping on cushions on the floor since sleeping on beds in the Middle East was for the wealthy. The word materas eventually descended into Middle English through the Romance languages. The oldest known mattress dates to around 77,000 years ago from South Africa and consisted of layers of twigs and leaves, notably including the leaves from Cryptocarya woodii which serves as a natural insect repellent and is believed to have been used to repel mosquitos.

Early mattresses contained a variety of natural materials including straw, feathers or horsehair. In the first half of the 20th century, a typical mattress sold in North America had an innerspring core and cotton batting or fiberfill. Modern mattresses usually contain either an inner spring core or materials such as latex, viscoelastic or other flexible polyurethane foams. Other fill components include insulator pads over the coils that prevent the bed's upholstery layers from cupping down into the innerspring, as well as polyester fiberfill in the bed's top upholstery layers. In 1899 James Marshall introduced the first individually wrapped pocketed spring coil mattress now commonly known as Marshall coils.

In North America, the typical mattress sold today is an innerspring; however, there is increasing interest in all-foam beds and hybrid beds, which include both an innerspring and high-end foams such as viscoelastic or latex in the comfort layers. In Europe, polyurethane foam cores and latex cores have long been popular. These make up a much larger proportion of the mattresses sold in the continent.

== Sizes ==
Mattresses are typically made to conform to bed sizing standards that vary by market. The size of mattress varies between national standards in width and height and depth. Many countries use non-numeric labels such as "King", "Queen", "Double", "Full" or "Single" to represent these dimensions.

=== Mattress topper ===
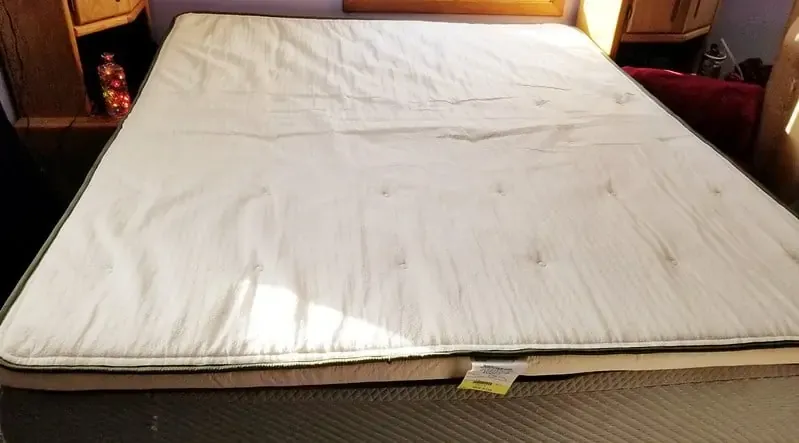
A mattress topper on a boxspring mattress

A mattress topper is a thin mattress, usually 5–10 centimetres (2–4 in) thick. Stand-alone mattresses of this size exist (see futon and floor beds; traditional European beds were made of a stack of mattresses of this size). But "mattress topper"s are usually sold for use on top of boxsprings (secured with straps or elasticated cloth corners). They are used to extend the life of the more-expensive boxspring, make a bed warmer or cooler (with airflow, or heat-conductive materials), make a firm bed softer, and for travel and dorms, as they are portable, especially if they are low-density.

Like a mattress protector/mattress pad/mattress cover (a thin, generally unpadded layer not designed to improve comfort), mattress toppers can be used to protect the mattress from the sleeper or vice versa. Some mattress toppers are machine-washable; covers and fillings are made from a range of materials.

== Types ==
=== Tick mattress ===
A tick mattress is a bag made of ticking (a type of cloth), filled with some suitable material. A paillasse or a featherbed is a tick mattress, as are most futons. They are simply constructed and were traditionally homemade. Because they are fairly thin and light, they are layered to form a bed.

=== Innerspring ===
Innerspring mattresses commonly consist of just the spring core, and the top and bottom upholstery layers.

==== Core ====
The core of the mattress supports the sleeper's body. Modern spring mattress cores, often called "innersprings" are made up of steel coil springs, or "coils".

The gauge of the coils is one factor which determines firmness and support. Coils are measured in quarter increments. The lower the number, the thicker the spring. In general, higher-quality mattress coils have a 14-gauge (1.63 mm) diameter. Coils of 14 to 15.5-gauge (1.63 to 1.37 mm) give more easily under pressure, while a 12.5-gauge (1.94 mm) coil, the thickest typically available, feels quite firm.

Connections between the coils help the mattress retain its shape. Most coils are connected by interconnecting wires; encased coils are not connected, but the fabric encasement helps preserve the mattress shape.

There are four types of mattress coils:

- Bonnell coils are the oldest and most common. First adapted from carriage seat springs of the 19th century, they are still prevalent in mid-priced mattresses. Bonnell springs are a knotted, round-top, hourglass-shaped steel wire coil. When laced together with cross wire helicals, these coils form the simplest innerspring unit, also referred to as a Bonnell unit.
- Offset coils are an hourglass type coil on which portions of the top and bottom convolutions have been flattened. In assembling the innerspring unit, these flat segments of wire are hinged together with helical wires. The hinging effect of the unit is designed to conform to body shape. LFK coils are an unknotted offset coil with a cylindrical or columnar shape.
- Continuous coils (the Leggett & Platt brand name is "Mira-coil") is an innerspring configuration in which the rows of coils are formed from a single piece of wire. They work in a hinging effect similar to that of offset coils.
- Marshall coils, also known as wrapped or encased coils or pocket springs, are thin-gauge, barrel-shaped, knot-less coils individually encased in fabric pockets—normally a fabric from man-made, non-woven fiber. Some manufacturers pre-compress these coils, which makes the mattress firmer and allows for motion separation between the sides of the bed. As the springs are not wired together, they work more or less independently: the weight on one spring does not affect its neighbors. More than half the consumers who participated in a survey had chosen to buy pocket spring mattresses.

==== Upholstery layers ====
Upholstery layers cover the mattress and provide cushioning and comfort. Some manufacturers call the mattress core the "support layer" and the upholstery layer the "comfort layer". The upholstery layer consists of three parts: the insulator, the middle upholstery, and the quilt.

The insulator separates the mattress core from the middle upholstery. It is usually made of fiber or mesh and is intended to keep the middle upholstery in place.

The middle upholstery comprises all the material between the insulator and the quilt. It is usually made from materials which are intended to provide comfort to the sleeper, including flexible polyurethane foam (which includes convoluted "egg-crate" foam), viscoelastic foam, latex foam, felt, polyester fiber, cotton fiber, wool fiber and non-woven fiber pads. In Europe and North America, mattress makers have begun incorporating gel-infused foams, soft-solid gels layered over foam, and poured gels in the top comfort layer of the bed.

The quilt is the top layer of the mattress. Made of light foam or fibers stitched to the underside of the ticking, it provides a soft surface texture to the mattress and can be found in varying degrees of firmness.

==== Foundation ====
There are three main types of foundation or bed base:

- A traditional box spring consists of a rigid frame containing extra heavy duty springs. This foundation is often paired with an innerspring mattress, as it extends the life of the spring unit at the mattress's core.
- An all-wood foundation usually has seven or eight support slats disposed below paperboard or beaverboard. This foundation, variously called a "no-flex", "low-flex" or zero-deflection unit, as well as an "ortho box", provides support similar to a platform foundation. All-wood foundations have become increasingly prevalent as U.S. mattress makers shifted to super-thick, one-sided mattresses.
- A grid-top foundation bed base is a type of bed foundation that features a grid-like structure made of metal or wood slats. The slats are spaced apart to provide support for a mattress and improve airflow to keep the mattress cool and dry.

This type of bed base is often used as an alternative to traditional box springs, which may be less durable and may not provide adequate support for heavier mattresses. Grid-top foundation bed bases are typically more durable and may offer greater stability for the mattress.

The grid-top design also allows for better weight distribution and can reduce pressure points, which can be beneficial for people with back pain or joint issues. Additionally, the open design of the foundation can make it easier to move and store compared to bulkier box springs.

Typically the measurements of a foundation will be about 1–2″ shorter than the measurement of a mattress.

==== Fabric cover ====
Ticking is the protective fabric cover used to encase mattresses and foundations. It is usually designed to coordinate with the foundation border fabric and comes in a wide variety of colors and styles. Mattress fabrics can be knits, damask or printed wovens, or inexpensive non-wovens. During the past decade, along with the rise in popularity of all-foam beds, stretchy knit ticking on the bed's top panel has become a standard look on both innerspring and foam beds. Most ticking is made with polyester yarns. More expensive mattress fabrics may contain a combination of polyester with rayon, cotton, silk, wool or other natural yarns.

Up until the early 2000s, beds were normally upholstered with a single fabric. This was usually a damask ticking or, for inexpensive bedsets, a non-woven fabric covering all surfaces of the mattress and foundation. Today's bedsets are covered with up to six different fabrics: A better quality circular knit or woven damask on the top panel—the bed's sleeping surface; a matching or contrasting (usually woven) fabric on the border of the mattress; a matching or contrasting (usually woven) fabric on the foundation side panels; a 'non-skid' woven or non-woven fabric on the surface of the foundation and reverse side of the mattress; and a non-woven dust cover on the under side of the foundation. Some North American mattress producers are beginning to use furniture upholstery fabrics on the bed's borders giving beds a more European, home furnishings look.

=== Foam mattress ===
All-foam mattresses use different weights and densities of petrochemical-based flexible polyurethane foams and viscoelastic foams or memory foam, and latex rubber foams. A number of mattress manufacturers have incorporated polyurethane and visco-elastic foams with a portion of plant-based content. All-foam mattresses are often paired with platform bases.

Latex foam
Latex foam in mattresses is generally a blend of the latex of the Hevea brasiliensis tree and synthetic latex, which is derived from petrochemicals and other substances and fillers. There are, however, natural-latex mattresses that leave out polyurethane-based chemicals. Latex foam is produced using either the Talalay or the Dunlop process.
Memory foam
Memory-foam mattresses use conforming viscoelastic foam over firmer polyurethane base foam. Some innerspring mattresses have memory foam in their upholstery layer. Different feels and comfort levels are achieved by varying the thickness, weight and formulation of the viscoelastic foams and the base foams. Latex- and memory-foam mattresses each provide a unique feel. This type of mattress is good at relieving pressure on painful joints. Many memory-foam mattresses are more expensive than standard spring mattresses. Memory foam is affected by temperature. In a cool bedroom, a memory-foam mattress will feel firmer than it does in a warm bedroom. Memory softens and conforms to the sleeper in response to body temperature and body weight. Traditional memory foam molds to the body, creating a depression the sleeper must roll out of when changing sleep positions. Mattress manufacturers have responded to this issue by using "faster-response" memory foams. They spring back more quickly when the sleeper moves. Foam mattresses are also known to generally "sleep warmer" than innerspring mattresses. Mattress makers have addressed the issue with "open-cell" memory foams, pinhole-cored memory foam, gel-infused memory foams, channel-cut foam cores, reticulated foam support layers and other technologies to improve air circulation through all-foam beds.
High-density foam
Similar to memory-foam mattresses, a high-density foam mattress uses a more compact foam, typically made from polyurethane. This kind of foam is made largely from open cells that are packed together tightly. High density foam mattresses offer comfort and longevity because they are more dense than a traditional foam mattress. High density foam mattresses that have an innerspring system last even longer and eliminate mattress sagging.

=== Bladder mattresses ===
Mattresses can also be made from bladders of some fluid, notably water or air. These date to antiquity – goatskin bladders filled with water were used in Persia at least as early as 3600 BCE – and gained increased popularity in the 20th century with improved manufacturing.

Air mattress
Air mattresses use one or more air chambers instead of springs to provide support. Quality and price can range from inexpensive ones used occasionally for camping, to high-end luxury beds. Air mattresses designed for typical bedroom use cost about the same as inner-spring mattresses with comparable features. Air bladder construction varies from a simple polyethylene bag to internally baffled, multiple chambers of latex (vulcanized rubber) or vinyl with bonded cotton exteriors. Mattresses may have a layer of foam above the air chambers for added cushioning, and may be enclosed in a cover. Some such beds are termed soft-sided air beds. Permanent use adjustable-firmness "airbeds" became popular particularly after market leader Select Comfort (now Sleep Number) began a major marketing campaign around 2001. The original airbed was manufactured by Comfortaire in 1981, which was later purchased by Select Comfort. There are several other manufacturers. Some allow independent adjustment of each side of the bed. They are made in a variety of models from basic, no-frills ones that measure about 7″ in height, to high-profile, 15″ tall hybrids that contain several types of foam, pillow tops, and digital pumps with memory for individual pressure settings. Studies suggest that adjustable-firmness beds are better for back pain. Adjustable-firmness mattresses for medical use have special control mechanisms. In the 1990s self-adjusting air beds that automatically change their pressure periodically, or inflate and deflate several air chambers alternately, were introduced. The intention of these periodic changes is to reduce problems with decubitus ulcers (bed sores), though as of 2008 the effectiveness of these techniques was still being researched. Air mattresses for camping are available which are filled with foam which itself provides little support, but expands when the air valve is opened allowing air to enter, so the mattress (nearly) inflates by itself. This is especially useful for campers who carry their equipment as, unlike with normal air mattresses, no pump is needed for inflating. Available brands include Aerobed, Coleman, Therm-a-Rest and others. The U.S. Consumer Product Safety Commission advises consumers not to let infants sleep on air mattresses. This is motivated by reports of deaths, mostly infants younger than 8 months of age, who were placed to sleep on air mattresses, and either suffocated in a face down position on an air mattress or died due to suffocation after falling into gaps between the mattress and bed frame, or the mattress and adjacent furniture or wall.
Waterbeds
A waterbed is a mattress with water in its interior instead of metal coils or air. Waterbeds can be lined with different layers of fiber to achieve the level of firmness the user desires. Waterbeds are well known for providing support to the spine and other body parts, similar to the other mattress types. There are several options of support which range up to 100% waveless, where the user does not notice that they are lying upon a waterbed.

== Quality ==
Many parameters determine the quality of a mattress. Laboratory test methods have been established for some of these parameters, such as pressure distribution, skin microclimate, hygiene, edge support, and long-term stability. Some of these have been developed by Duncan Bain, working on behalf of the UK's Medicines and Healthcare products Regulatory Agency.

Other parameters, such as firmness, are more specific to the sleeper. In general, firm mattresses are recommended for stomach and some back sleepers, soft mattresses are recommended for side sleepers, and medium mattresses are recommended for the majority of back sleepers. Double mattresses are available with a softer and a firmer part, or with adjustable firmness levels, to accommodate sleepers with different preferences who share a bed.

=== Ergonomics ===
In 2003, a randomized-controlled trial found that medium-firm mattresses assessed using the Hs scale from the European Committee for Standardization were associated with less pain; this study has been cited by clinical practice guidelines on lower back pain. In 2015, a systematic review of studies concluded that medium-firm, custom-inflated mattresses were best for pain and neutral spinal alignment.

== Lifespan ==
The term mattress lifespan refers to the duration in which all types of mattress can retain their original support and comfort. Mattresses deteriorate over time, and the lifespan of a mattress depends on a variety of factors, notably materials, manufacturing quality, care, and the rigorousness of use. A poor quality foam comfort layer can deteriorate noticeably in 1 year, while a quality latex core can last 20 years or more; innerspring cores typically last around 10 years. The comfort layer is almost invariably the first area to fail, which is why mattresses are often double-sided, to extend the lifespan. A separate topper may be used instead of or in addition to a comfort layer, which reduces wear and is replaceable without replacing the entire mattress. The majority of high-end mattresses have a lifespan of between 7–10 years but it can last beyond 10 years and more depending on the level of care.

In the United States, mattress warranties are typically for 10 years or 20 years, sometimes 25 years, though this specifically addresses manufacturing defects and faster-than-normal deterioration, not expected deterioration with time. In the United States, as of 2008 there is a general expectation that mattresses should last about 10 years, and this is the average number of years Americans keep mattresses, though this varies by age group. This expectation is based on a number of factors, including sales pitches; the expectation that mattresses will last the length of their warranty, hence 10 years or 20 years, accordingly; and comparison with other household items.

The mattress replacement cycle is a key driver of income and profits for the mattress industry – a five-year replacement cycle yields double the sales of a 10-year replacement cycle, for instance – so the mattress industry has a financial incentive to shorten the replacement cycle. Notably, the International Sleep Products Association (ISPA) established the Better Sleep Council (BSC) in 1979 with the stated goal to "shorten the mattress replacement cycle", in addition to encouraging people to "invest in better bedding".

An industry-funded 2006 study by researchers at Oklahoma State University (funded by the BSC) of 59 people with poor sleep who received free new replacement mattresses for their existing mattresses 5 years or older (average age 9.5 years) found improved sleep, particularly when the existing mattresses were cheap. A follow-up paper by some of the same authors with additional statistical analysis reinforced these conclusions. The BSC has subsequently cited this study in the ISPA-published news magazine for mattress manufacturers, BedTimes, to advocate a more frequent replacement cycle, specifically to "consider replacing a mattress every five to seven years"; the recommendation is based largely on this study.

== Maintenance and care ==
Wear problems occur with most mattresses and can include sagging, mildew, and staining. These are prevented by proper support, rotation and flipping, keeping it dry, and using a mattress pad or protector. Some symptoms of a broken or worn-out mattress include springs which can be felt poking through the upholstery layer, visible permanent sagging or deformity, lumpiness, and excessive squeaking.

Mattresses require a solid foundation which does not itself sag – a sagging foundation, such as by weak slats on a wide bed, will in turn cause the mattress to sag. Consistently sleeping in the same place and body position causes excessive wear, and thus rotating or flipping mattresses is used to reduce this: double-sided mattresses can be alternately flipped width-wise (about the long axis) and length-wise (about the shorter axis), or alternately flipped and rotated; while single-sided mattresses are only rotated, which is simpler but less effective. Flipping/rotation schedules vary between materials and manufacturers, but typically recommended is monthly for the first six months and every two or three months thereafter. Foundations should also be rotated, if possible, though less frequently – rotating box springs twice a year is recommended. While sagging is undesirable, some level of indentation (about 8 cm (3.1 in)) is natural if natural materials are used in a comfort layer.

Excessive wear on mattresses can occur when folding and bending takes place, placing heavy objects in one spot, or excess force on the handles; these cause more rapid deterioration. Care should particularly be taken during transport or storage.

Mattresses require ventilation to remain dry and prevent mildew, and thus should not be placed directly on the floor or on a solid surface – slats or a box spring provide space for airflow, while solid wood or plywood (as in cheap bunkie boards) does not. Additional ventilation is recommended for natural materials, in which case leaving the mattress "naked" after stripping sheets (for example while laundering) is recommended. If a mattress is allowed to become damp, for example by wet cleaning, mildew may develop inside the upholstery; cleaning with a vacuum cleaner or mild surface cleanser and a slightly damp cloth avoids this.

Mattresses absorb fluids and stains readily, notably from nightly sweating (which results in a yellow stain), seminal (or Cowper) stains which are darker, menstrual fluids which are dark red, and other bodily fluids in addition to accidental spills. These visibly stain the ticking and seep through into lower layers. In addition to being unhygienic, hard to launder, and unsightly, such stains typically void a warranty. Thus a mattress protector is suggested to protect the mattress; this can be removed and cleaned separately, and replaced if damaged.

== Industry ==
Companies often specialize in a particular type of mattress, such as innerspring, latex, and airbed, although as latex and airbeds have become more popular, they have become more common.

=== United States of America ===
Mattresses which are mostly the same are often sold under different brand names; two of the largest brands, Serta and Simmons, became owned by the same company after a private equity buyout. Simmons, founded in the late 1800s, was bought and sold multiple times and faced bankruptcy after a major decline in the bedding industry in the 2000s. The International Sleep Products Association was founded in 1915 and releases a report on U.S. mattress sales. Another association, Specialty Sleep Association, represents companies such as Innomax and Boyd Specialty focused on latex, waterbeds, and airbeds. However, Select Comfort, which produces airbeds (a specialty bed), is a member of the ISPA.

Originally founded in 1881, the Sealy Corporation was purchased by Tempur-Pedic in 2012, which had introduced an all foam (TEMPUR-Material) brand into the United States in 1992.

Adjustable beds have become a trend and are more compatible with certain types of mattresses such as latex or memory foam. These are particularly popular in Europe, and for one business accounted for 25% of beds in Sweden in 2010 and 70% of beds in the Netherlands.

In the 2010s, affiliate marketing became a major part of the business model for direct-to-consumer online mattress companies such as Amerisleep. Later, companies like Casper and Purple, with venture capital and funding followed and helped grow the global mattress industry to a $28.5 billion dollar industry in 2018. According to experts, there are over 175 bed-in-a-box mattress companies in the United States. Mattress suggestion methods are emerging in response to the crowded retail marketplace.

Another large company, Spring Air, went bankrupt in 2009 and was purchased by one of its former executives.

Comfortaire, founded in 1981, was the first to specialize in airbeds. It was later bought by Select Comfort.

=== Spain ===
Pikolin, founded in 1948, is one of the largest manufacturers of mattresses.

== See also ==
- Bed frame
- Duvet
- International Sleep Products Association
- Law label – the "Do Not Remove Tag Under Penalty of Law" label
- Matratzenlager – mattress room in mountain huts
- Orthopedic mattress
- Sleeping pad – for camping
