= Coverlet =

A coverlet (earlier coverlid) is a fabric covering spread, usually for a bed, and may refer to:

- Woven coverlet, a bed covering used in the United States from the colonial period to the mid-19th century
- Duvet cover
- Quilt
- A type of altar cloth

== See also ==
- Bedding
