= Lie-in =

Lie-in may refer to

- Die-in, a form of protest
- Duvet day, an unplanned day off work

== See also ==
- Lie in Our Graves
- Lie in state
