= Duvet =

Type of bedding

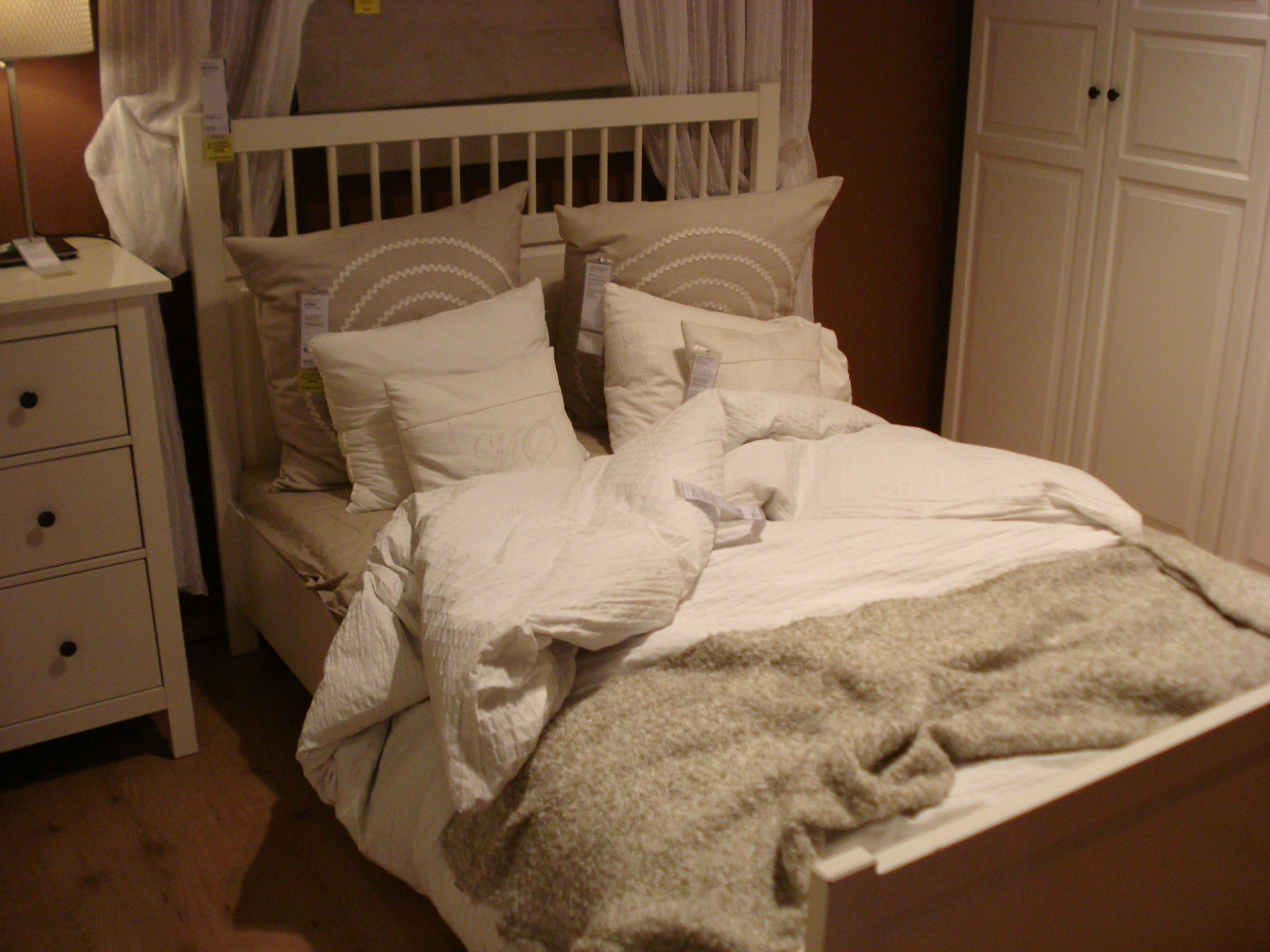
A bed with a duvet

A duvet (UK: /ˈduːveɪ/ DOO-vay, US: /duːˈveɪ/ doo-VAY; from French duvet [dyvɛ] 'down'), usually called a comforter or (down-filled) quilt in American English, and a doona in Australian English, is a type of bedding consisting of a soft flat bag filled with down, feathers, wool, cotton, silk, or a synthetic alternative, and is typically protected with a removable cover, similar to a pillow and pillow case. Sleepers often use a duvet without a top bed sheet, as the duvet cover can readily be removed and laundered as often as the bottom sheet.

The term duvet is mainly British, especially in reference to the bedding. The term is rare in US English, where it typically refers to the cover, not the bedding itself.

Duvets originated in rural Europe and were filled with the down feathers of ducks or geese. The best quality feathers are taken from the eider duck, whose feathers are known for their effectiveness as a thermal insulator.

In Britain, prior to the 1970s, a similar form of bedding was called an eiderdown. The British eiderdown was thinner than its continental equivalent. It was placed on top of a sheet and blankets, for extra warmth, rather than being used instead of a sheet and blankets.

== Name ==
The word duvet is of French origin, meaning "down feather". Its first known mention in English came in 1759, when Samuel Johnson used it in one of The Idler series of essays. Duvets are often more commonly known by other names outside of Europe.

=== Australia and Europe ===
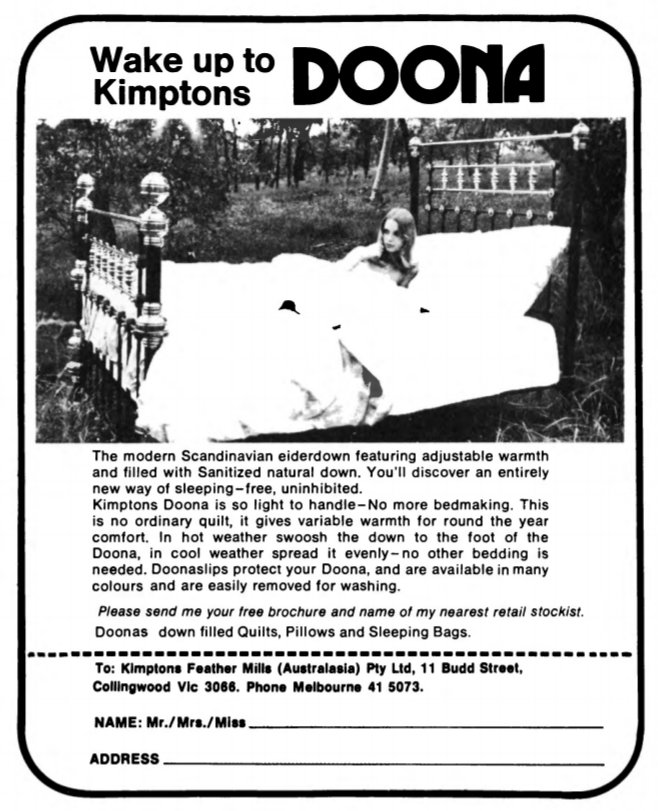
1974 Kimptons doona advertisement in the Canberra Times

Originally called a continental quilt, duvets are commonly referred to in Australia by the generic trademark doona. The Doona brand of duvets were originally manufactured by the Melbourne-based textile company Kimptons and became popular in the 1970s, with the brandname eventually becoming a generic term in Australian English. After a series of mergers and acquisitions, Tontine Group has held the Doona trademark since 1991. Kimptons' adoption of the term "doona" is generally held to be from the Danish "dyne" (pronounced du-neh), meaning eiderdown, originally from the Norse "dýna". The word occurs in similar form also in Swedish and Norwegian; elsewhere other variants are also found such as "dunyha" in Hungarian and also, with the same meaning, in Romani or Romany, the language of the travelling Romani people of Europe (gypsies).

=== Asia ===
In South Asian countries like India and Pakistan, duvets are known as "ralli quilts" or razai.

=== United States ===
In American English, a duvet may be called a comforter; however, comforter is generally used to refer to a slightly different type of bedding that is not as thick, does not have a cover, and is often used over a top sheet.

== History ==
During the early middle ages, duvets of eider (duck) down were used by people on the northern coast of Norway. The down from eider has been used for duvets, at least for a thousand years. The Oseberg viking ship AD 820 contained, amongst the deposits, down duvets. In the 15th century, featherbeds (mattresses) were used by rich monarchs in continental Europe and in England, though not by their courtiers. From the 16th century, wealthy people all over continental Europe began buying and using feather duvets.

Feather duvets came late to England. Samuel Pepys slept under one on 9 September 1665 while visiting his friend Captain George Cocke, whose wife was from Danzig. Paul Rycaut was among the first to try to promote the duvet in England. Around 1700, he sent six-pound bags of down to his friends with instructions, warning that "the coverlet must be quilted high and in large panes, or otherwise it will not be warme". He also tried to sell them without success.

In the mid-18th century, Thomas Nugent, a Briton on a grand tour then passing through Westphalia, observed with surprise:

There is one thing very particular to them, that they do not cover themselves with bed-clothes, but lay one feather-bed over, and another under. This is comfortable enough in winter, but how they can bear their feather-beds over them in summer, as is generally practised, I cannot conceive.

Feather coverings came to be used in the United Kingdom in the mid-19th century, just as feather mattresses became common, and were unsurprisingly known as "continental quilts". They were not, however, universal. Of a British traveller in Germany in the 1930s, it was said that "She even learned to like feather quilts ('they don't seem to know about blankets – perhaps they didn't have them in the middle ages')". Duvets remained uncommon in Britain until the 1960s.

Duvets are the most common form of bed covering, especially in northern Europe. They became popular throughout the world in the late 20th century. They are reported to have been introduced to Britain by Sir Terence Conran who sold them in via his London Habitat store from 1964; Conran had encountered them in Sweden in the previous decade and believed that they offered an alternative to the traditional, cumbersome British method of bed-making that involved a top sheet, blankets, with sometimes also a thinner (British style) "eiderdown" on the top for extra warmth. British users gradually came to prefer the style of sleeping under a duvet for the freedom of movement it offered and the reduced feel of weight on the body, in addition to the simplification of the bed making process.

== Description ==
Duvets provide insulation by trapping air within their filling material, reducing heat loss from the body during sleep. The warmth of a duvet depends on factors including filling type, filling weight, loft, and the structure of the outer shell fabric. Natural fillings such as down are valued for their high warmth-to-weight ratio, while synthetic fillings are often designed to provide similar insulating properties with easier care requirements.

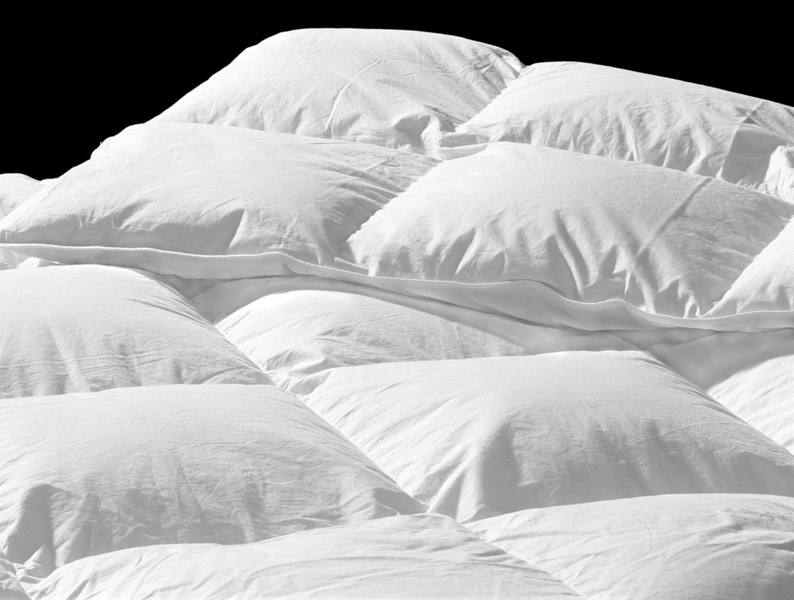
A duvet without a cover, "quilted high and in large panes"

A modern duvet, like a sleeping bag, may be filled with down or feathers of various quality and cost, or silk, wool, cotton, or artificial fibers such as polyester batting. Duvets can be made warmer than blankets without becoming heavy, and thereby can reduce the complexity of making a bed, as they can be used without additional blankets, quilts or other bed covers. Although bed making is indeed simpler using a duvet than its traditional "sheet plus blankets" equivalent, this may come at a cost: since a duvet is, by its nature, a fixed thermal efficiency or "tog rating", multiple duvets, of different tog ratings, may be required to be purchased per individual bed to suit the variation in warmth as required for the different seasons if adamant on not tossing a blanket on top for added warmth.

=== Hygiene ===
The duvet itself, just like an eiderdown, may be cleaned much more rarely, and depending on its contents, may require specialist dry cleaning. Thus something easily washable is usually placed between the sleeper and the duvet, that can be removed and laundered as often as the bottom sheet and pillow cases. While it is perfectly possible to use top sheets, the common practice is specially made bag-covers, usually of cotton or a cotton-polyester blend. While a comforter is fundamentally the same as a duvet in terms of construction, it is used somewhat differently. In the United States, comforters are used on top of the flat sheet, often without a cover.

== Thermal performance (tog rating) ==
Manufacturers rate the performance of their duvets in togs (0.1°C difference between the outsides at 1 Watt per square meter), as a measurement of thermal insulation. This enables the purchaser to select a duvet appropriate to the season: the higher the tog rating, the warmer the duvet.

A few manufacturers have marketed combined duvet sets consisting of one 4.5 tog and one 9.0 tog. The light-weight one is for summer and the medium one for spring and autumn; snapped together, 13.5 togs is designed for winter. Manufacturers may also offer up to 15 tog duvets.

In some countries, such as France, the warmth of a duvet is rated in grams per square metre (g/m^{2}) instead of togs. The two systems are incompatible because, for example, a 250 g/m^{2} polyester filling and a 250 g/m^{2} feather filling have the same weight but offer different levels of thermal insulation and therefore different tog ratings. However, typical all-season sets are sold as a pair of 200 g/m^{2} and 300 g/m^{2} duvets, creating a combined 500 g/m^{2} winter duvet, which would therefore be expected to match 13.5 togs.

== Disadvantages ==
Duvets/continental quilts/doonas are generally marketed as providing a more comfortable, wrap-around sleep experience, better freedom of movement for the sleeper, and easier/quicker bed making compared with the traditional "sheet and blankets" approach commonly found in the U.K. prior to their adoption. They do, however, come with some disadvantages, namely:

- The best duvets (filled with either 100%, or a high percentage of down) are expensive; cheaper equivalents (filled with either 100%, or a high percentage of feather, or a synthetic filling) are either heavier, or less comfortable for the same tog rating
- Duvets filled with feathers and/or down cannot be machine washed at home, but require specialist care
- Duvets tend to come in a fixed tog (warmth) rating, so a winter-grade duvet may be too warm for summer use, and vice versa
- Not all down is ethically produced (being a product of animal farming); certified ethically produced down products generally cost more
- Some people have allergies to products filled with feathers and/or down; for them, synthetic fillings are recommended.

== Standards and sizes ==
Modern manufacturing conventions have resulted in a large number of sizes and standards.

== In popular culture ==
In the story The Princess and the Pea, published in 1835, H.C. Andersen wrote about a princess lying on twenty eiderdown duvets.

An eiderdown is mentioned in the Pink Floyd songs Julia Dream, Flaming and A Pillow of Winds.

The term "duvet day" is used in some countries to describe an allowance of one or more days a year when employees can simply phone in and say that they are not coming in to work, even though they have no leave booked and are not ill. The provision of this benefit became fashionable in the late 1990s with many larger employers in the UK.

In the 1999 American film Fight Club, Tyler Durden gives a speech in which he describes duvets as pretentious blankets:

Do you know what a duvet is? [...] It’s a blanket. It’s just a blanket. Then why do guys like you and I know what a duvet is? Is this essential to our survival in the hunter-gatherer sense of the word?

== See also ==
- List of English words of French origin (D–I)
- Fill power
- Futon
- Silk comforter
