= Eiderdown =

Eiderdown can refer to:

- The down feathers of the eider duck
- Eiderdown (bedding), a duvet or comforter (a kind of quilt), traditionally containing eider duck down
