= Bedding =

Bed covering fabrics

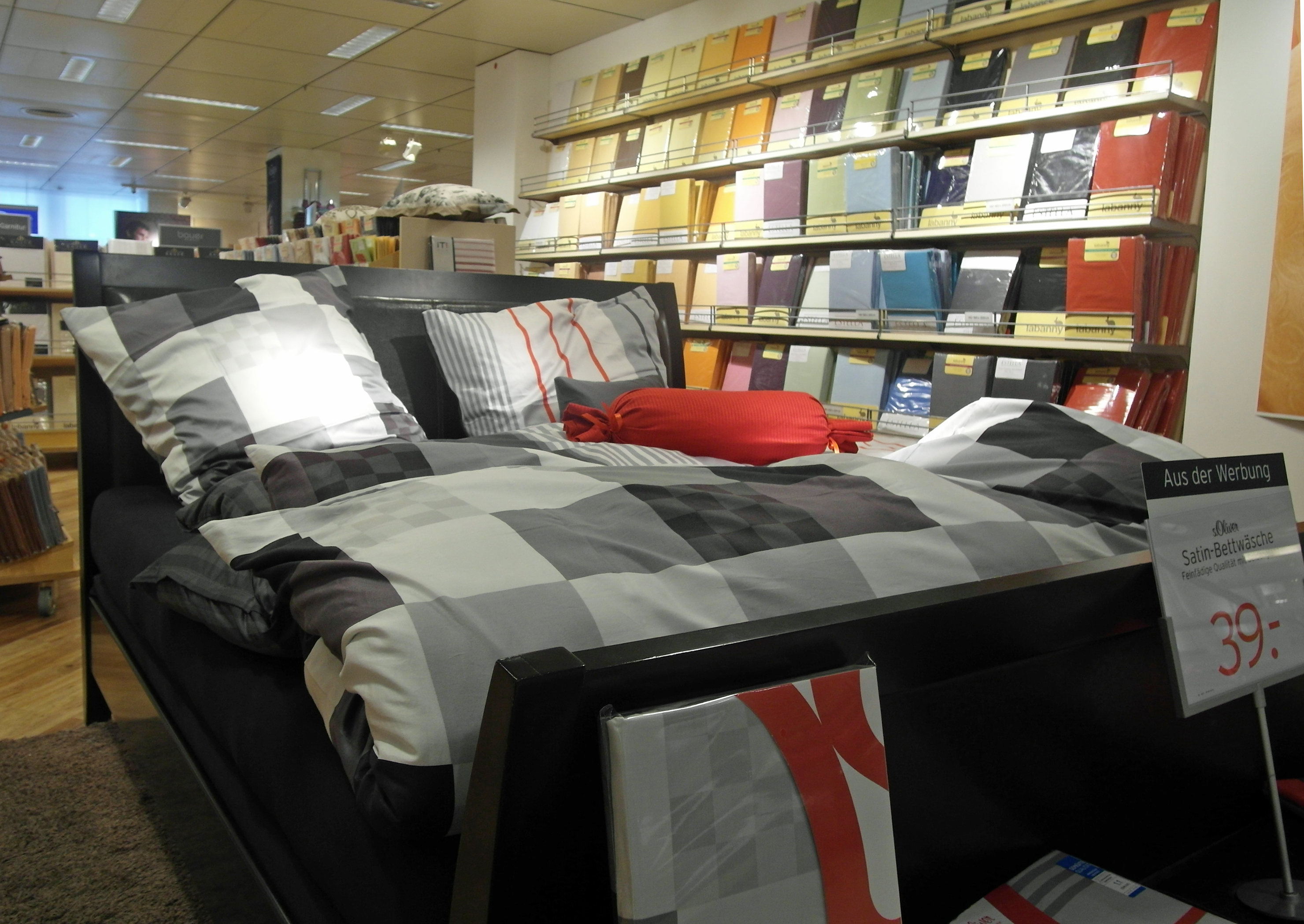
Bedclothes in a retail store

Bedding, also called bedclothes or bed linen, is the materials laid above the mattress of a bed for hygiene, warmth, protection of the mattress, and decorative effect, i.e. the removable and washable portion of a human sleeping environment. Multiple sets of bedding for each bed are often washed in rotation and/or changed seasonally to improve sleep comfort at varying room temperatures. Most standardized measurements for bedding are rectangular, but there are also some square-shaped sizes, which allow the user to put on bedding without having to consider its lengthwise orientation (e.g. a 220 cm × 220 cm (87 in × 87 in) duvet).

In American English, the word bedding generally does not include the mattress, while in British English it often does. In Australian and New Zealand English, bedding is often called manchester, especially in shops. Manchester was a center of the cotton industry in the late 18th and the 19th century, and into the 20th century, and so cotton goods (principally sheets and towels) were given the name 'Manchester goods', which later was simplified to 'manchester'.

A set of bedding generally consists of at least flat or fitted bed sheet that covers the mattress; a flat top sheet; either a blanket, a quilt, or a duvet. Sometimes a duvet cover is used in addition to or instead of – the top sheet; and a number of pillows with pillowcases, also referred to as pillow shams. (See § Elements for more info on all these terms.) Additional blankets, etc. may be added to ensure the necessary insulation in cold sleeping areas. A common practice for children and some adults is to decorate a bed with plush stuffed animals, dolls, and other soft toys. These are not included under the designation of bedding, although they may provide additional warmth to the sleeper.

== Materials ==
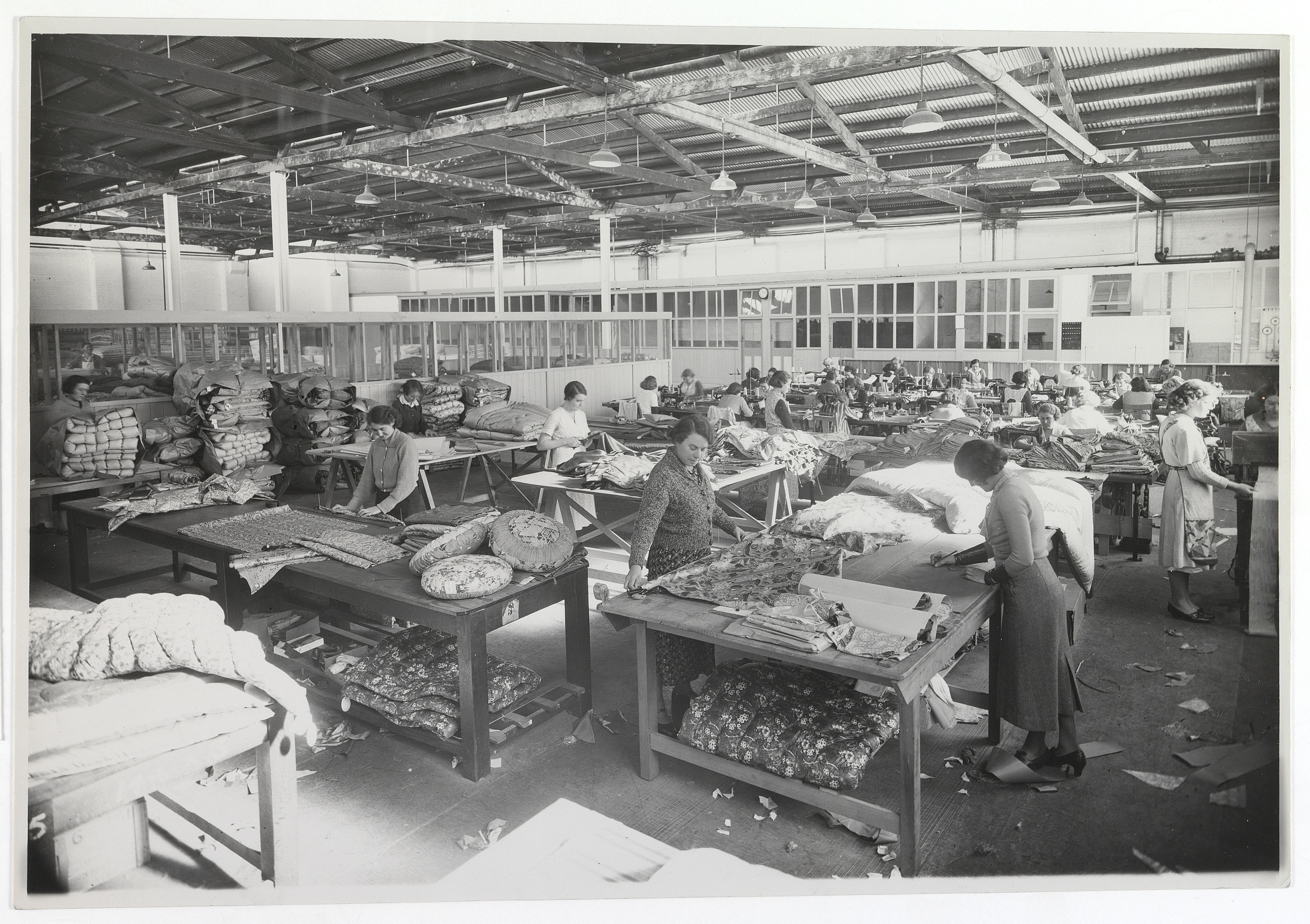
Women making bedding and pillows, factory, Anthony Hordern and Sons, Sydney, 1933-1938

Lightweight white, solid-color or printed plain weave, satin weave, or flannel cotton or cotton/polyester blends are the most common types of sheeting, although linen and silk may also be used, including in combination. Goose or duck down and other feathers are frequently used as a warm and lightweight filling in duvets, comforters and quilts. But such fill can protrude in part even from tightly woven fabric, and be an irritant for many people, particularly those with allergies. Natural and synthetic down alternatives are marketed. Cotton, wool or polyester batting is commonly used as fill in quilts and down alternative comforters. These are less expensive and more easily laundered than natural down or feathers. Synthetic fibers are best in the form of thermofused (where fibers cross) batting. Thick-woven or knitted wool, cotton, acrylic or other microfiber synthetics, or blends of these, are typically used for blankets.

== History ==
Among the earliest discovered examples of bedding are remnants found in a Paleolithic structure at Ohalo II, Israel. Dating back 23,000 years, these remnants consist of partially charred stems and leaves positioned on the floor surrounding a central hearth. Potential earlier evidence of bedding, dating from the Middle Paleolithic, is evident in Spain's Esquilleu cave, displaying the gathering of grass near a hearth.

Around 3400 BC Egyptian pharaohs had their beds moved off the ground and slept on a raised surface. Bed linen was widely evolved in Egypt. It was seen as a symbol of light and purity, as well as a symbol of prosperity. The Egyptian mummies were often wrapped in bed linen. The complexity of applications has increased with research and developments in the area of bed linen materials over the years.

Roman Empire mattresses were stuffed with wool, feather, reeds or hay. The beds were decorated with paint, bronze, silver, jewels and gold. It was rare for a Roman couple to spend the night together. It was more common for each spouse to have a separate room. Researchers believe that the Roman bed was definitely less comfortable than today.

During the Renaissance, mattresses were stuffed with straw and feathers and then covered with silks, velvets or satin material. Embroidered canopies and ornamental hangings as well as the advent of the featherbed led to beds becoming extremely expensive, often willed down from generation to generation.

In the 18th century, Europeans began to use bed frames made from cast iron, and mattresses that were made of cotton. Until that time, assorted vermin were simply accepted as a component of even the most royal beds.

In the 19th century the bed spring was invented, also called the box spring.

In the 20th century United States, consumers bought the inner spring mattress, followed in the 1960s by the water bed (originating on the West Coast), and adoption of Japanese-style futons, air mattresses, and foam rubber mattresses and pillows.

== Elements ==
Name(s)	Image	Description
Bed skirt (also bed ruffle, dust ruffle or bed valance)		A decorative piece used to cover the boxspring and legs of the bed. It fits between the mattress and boxspring and hangs to or almost to the floor.
Bedspread (also bedcover)		A bed cover, often decorative, with sides that go to or near the floor. Protects bedding, including pillows, during daytime from dust or other contamination. This does not require a bed skirt, and was particularly popular in North America after World War II. May be removed at night and, if wanted, replaced by a coverlet or duvet cover.
Blanket		A woven cloth covering used for warmth.
Bolster		A long, narrow and commonly cylindrical pillow filled with down or feathers. Used for decoration or lumbar support when lying against the headboard.
Boudoir pillows (or breakfast pillows)		Small rectangular decorative throw pillows.
Comforter		A bed cover, used like a blanket, that is filled with padding and is not exceptionally fluffy. It is usually reversible and machine-washable. Comforters are usually paired with a bed skirt to form a complete ensemble, as the comforter's sides only go about halfway to the floor. It differs from a quilt in that the layers of a comforter are not quilted together. (Also see "duvet").
Coverlet		Style of bedspread used before the 20th century in America. It usually does not reach to the floor, and does not cover the pillows.
Duvet		A soft flat bag traditionally filled with down or feathers, or a combination of both, or synthetic materials, and used like a blanket. Usually not as thin as a comforter, but may be referred to as a "down comforter".
Duvet cover		A decorative and protective covering for a duvet. Most duvet covers have a button or tie closure at one end. Australians use the term doona cover rather than "duvet cover". Usually has a thread count of 180-400 per square inch (or equivalently, a thread count of 280-620 per 10 square centimetres).
European pillow (or Continental pillow)		A Euro or Continental pillow – a large square pillow – is a decorative pillow that sits back against the headboard. These are often placed behind the standard size pillow shams as a backdrop, or on top of standard pillows as a coordinated set with a duvet cover.
European sham (or Euro sham or Continental sham)		A decorative pillow covering which fits a large 75 cm × 75 cm (30 in × 30 in) pillow.
Feather bed		Feathers contained within a fabric shell that lies on top of a mattress as a mattress topper. The featherbed will normally have elastic straps or even have a fitted sheet on it so that it fits over a mattress and stays in place.
Flat sheet (or top sheet)		The flat sheet is tucked in around the mattress over the fitted sheet with the fourth side, at the head of the bed, undone. Some duvet or comforter sets do not include a top sheet; the duvet/comforter has a cotton bottom that replaces the sheet.
Fitted sheet		This is the bottom sheet used to fit tightly over a mattress. Fitted sheets are available in a variety of pocket depths, which refers to the thickness of the mattress. Standard North American pocket size is 7 to 9 in (18 to 23 cm). Deep pocket corners are usually 10 to 13 in (25 to 33 cm). Extra deep pocket corners are very generous in size, ranging from 14 to 22 in (36 to 56 cm), and are used for extraordinarily high/deep mattresses.
Mattress pad Also known as a mattress topper, or underpad.		This is used above the mattress and beneath a bottom sheet to add comfort or to protect the mattress from being soiled by use.
Mattress protector		This is used immediately above a mattress to protect the mattress. Some also protect the sleeper from allergens.
Neck roll		Small cylindrical decorative throw pillows; used for cervical vertebrae support or pure decoration. Neck rolls typically do not have an opening such as a zipper; they are usually sewn closed, although some designs have an integrated opening at the ends.
Pillow shams		Decorative coverings for pillows, often designed with trims, ruffles, flanges, or cording. Shams are normally placed behind the pillows used to sleep on, which would be covered with regular pillowcases.
Quilt		Quilts are types of blankets that sandwich batting between two layers of cloth, and then stitch through all of the layers to hold them together. Patchwork quilts piece together multiple pieces of fabric to make one of the outer layers of cloth.
Sleeping pillow		The medium-sized rectangular pillow that one lays one's head on when sleeping. A sleeping pillow can come in many sizes such as standard 20 in × 26 in (51 cm × 66 cm), Queen 20 in × 30 in (51 cm × 76 cm), or King 20 in × 36 in (51 cm × 91 cm) and differing firmness for back, stomach or side sleeping.
Throw pillow		A decorative pillow that comes in numerous shapes and sizes.

== Terminology ==
- Drop: The vertical dimension of a bed skirt.
- Flanged: Including a decorative band of fabric that is straight or tailored; often used to describe pillows or pillow shams.
- Hotel bedding: sheets with a high-thread count and unadorned designs, marketed to replicate the bedding materials that hotels use. The expansion of business travel has created a consumer demand for such products.
- Mako cotton: A high grade of cotton, the long staple or long fibre of Egyptian-grown cotton has more continuous fibres to use when creating threads or yarns. The yarn is smaller in diameter yet stronger than other cottons. Smaller yarn means that more threads per square inch can be used to create stronger fabrics which are lighter in weight yet breathe well. Mako cotton is frequently used to make upscale sheets and towels, which are marketed as a luxury product.
- Palliasse: Bedding made from strong material, filled with organic material, such as straw or horsehair and used as a mattress.
- Pima cotton: A high grade of cotton. It has the long staple similar to Mako cotton, which is what gives it its softness and luster, as well as its durability. Its superior characteristics improve with wear. Pima cotton is used to make upscale sheets, towels and clothing, which are marketed as a luxury product. Peru produces most of the world's Pima cotton.
- Pleated: Material that is sewn in folds, like a fan.
- Tailored: Fitted closely, i.e. made to fit the bed exactly.
- Thread count: Usually measured either as the number of threads per square inch (i.e. 1 in × 1 in (2.54 cm × 2.54 cm)) or per 10 cm^{2} (i.e. 3.16 cm × 3.16 cm (1.24 in × 1.24 in)). The two measurement methods will yield different thread count numbers. For example, a count of 250 threads/in^{2} equals 31.2 threads/cm^{2}.
- Throw blanket (also throw): A small covering usually used for warmth and decoration; it is usually placed at the end of the bed.

== Sizes ==
Bedding sizes are made with consideration of the dimensions of the bed and mattress for which it is to be used. Bed sizes vary around the world, with countries having their own standards and terminology.

== See also ==
- Bed sheet
- Bed-making
- Blanket
- Comforter
- Duvet
- Futon
- Pillow
- Quilt
- Sleeping bag
