= Comforter =

Type of bedcover

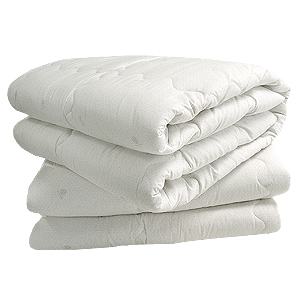
A white comforter

A comforter (in American English), also known as a doona in Australian English, or a continental quilt (or simply quilt) or duvet in British English, is a type of bedding made of two lengths of fabric or covering sewn together and filled with insulative materials for warmth, traditionally down or feathers, wool or cotton batting, silk, or polyester and other down alternative fibers. Like quilts, comforters are generally laid over a top bed sheet (and sometimes also blankets) and used to cover the body during sleep. Duvets are another form of quilt, traditionally filled with feathers. Duvets originated in rural northern Europe and were originally made from the down of the eider (Somateria), a type of duck whose feathers are well known for their thermal insulation properties.

Today, duvets are used especially in Europe and have become popular worldwide since the late 20th century. Their popularity in northern Europe is reflected in their common name, Nordic duvet, and since the late 20th century are often made of synthetic fibres or down alternatives.

A comforter is sometimes covered for protection and prolonged use. Comforter covers are similar in principle to pillowcases, usually closed with zippers or buttons.

In the United Kingdom, the term comforter is not generally used. (Note: In British English, the word 'comforter' is a dated word meaning a woollen scarf for winter. See wikt:comforter.) It is instead called a quilt (or continental quilt), a duvet or an eiderdown. A duvet differs in that it is thicker and usually used with a cover, and without blankets or extra sheets.

In Indonesia, the term comforter is not generally used. It is instead called a Bed Cover. Usually bed cover is sold in packages containing sheets and comforter.

Sometimes a comforter is sold as part of a "bed in a bag", usually a case of some sort with handles that contains an entire set of bedding in the same or a matching pattern: comforter and top sheet, fitted sheet, pillowcase(s), and perhaps pillow sham(s). Some sets have a duvet and duvet cover (more popular in Europe) in place of a comforter and top sheet. More deluxe sets may include a bed skirt and pillows.

Comforters are usually used in the winter season when it is very cold, although a variety of different thicknesses means that they can be used in other seasons as well, with lighter examples being used in warmer weather. Due to the thickness of a comforter or the amount of down/feathers or other filling it has, a person is insulated against cold.

Comforter sizes correspond with bed sizes: twin, full, queen, king, and cal-king. Comforter sizes run slightly larger than mattress sizes to allow for draping over the sides of the bed. Typical sizes in the United States for comforters are:

- Twin Bed = 64 in (163 cm) width × 87 in (221 cm) length
- Queen Bed / Full = 87 in (221 cm) width × 87 in (221 cm) length
- King Bed = 101 in (257 cm) width × 90 in (229 cm) length

== Construction ==
Filling – Comforters are filled with layers of natural material such as down feathers, wool, or silk; alternatively, polyester batting is used. Comforters can also be made out of fur, usually with a backing of satin or silk. The loft of the filling determines the weight as well as the level of insulation. The comforter is stitched or quilted to secure the filling and keep it evenly distributed.

Shell/covering – The outer shells of comforters are typically made with cotton, silk, or polyester fabrics or blends, of varying thread counts. Comforter shells vary in design and color, often designed to coordinate with other bedding.

== Materials ==
=== Types of thermal insulation ===
- PrimaLoft
- Thinsulate
- Down feathers
- Polyester

== See also ==
- Silk comforter
