= Down feather =

Soft, fine feather, sometimes under larger feathers

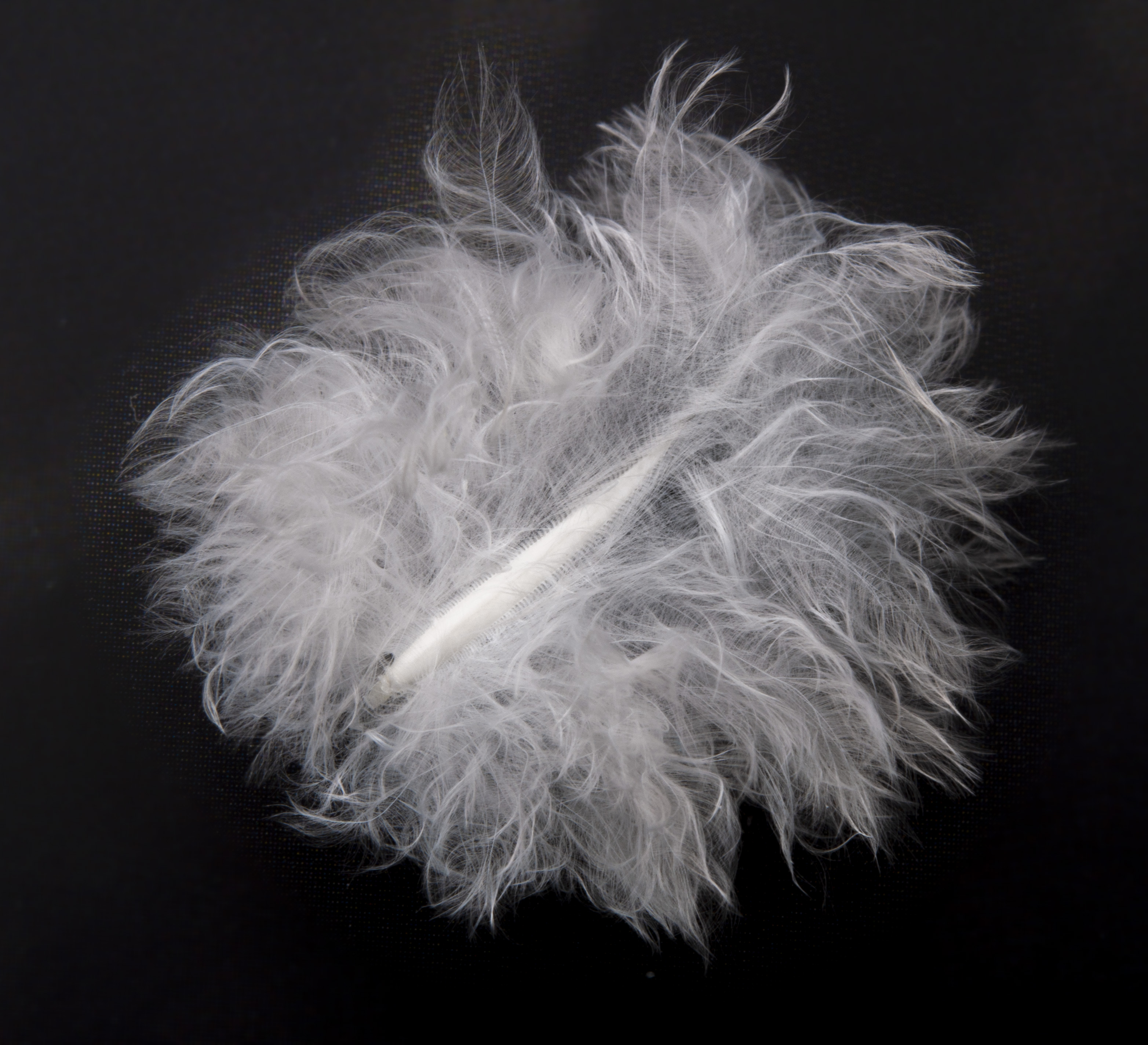
Down feathers lack the interlocking barbules of pennaceous feathers, making them very soft and fluffy.

The down of birds is a layer of fine feathers found under the tougher exterior feathers. Very young birds are clad only in down. Powder down is a specialized type of down found only in a few groups of birds. Down is a fine thermal insulator and padding, used in goods such as jackets, bedding (duvets and featherbeds), pillows and sleeping bags. The discovery of feathers trapped in ancient amber suggests that some species of non-avian dinosaur likely possessed down-like feathers.

== Description and etymology ==
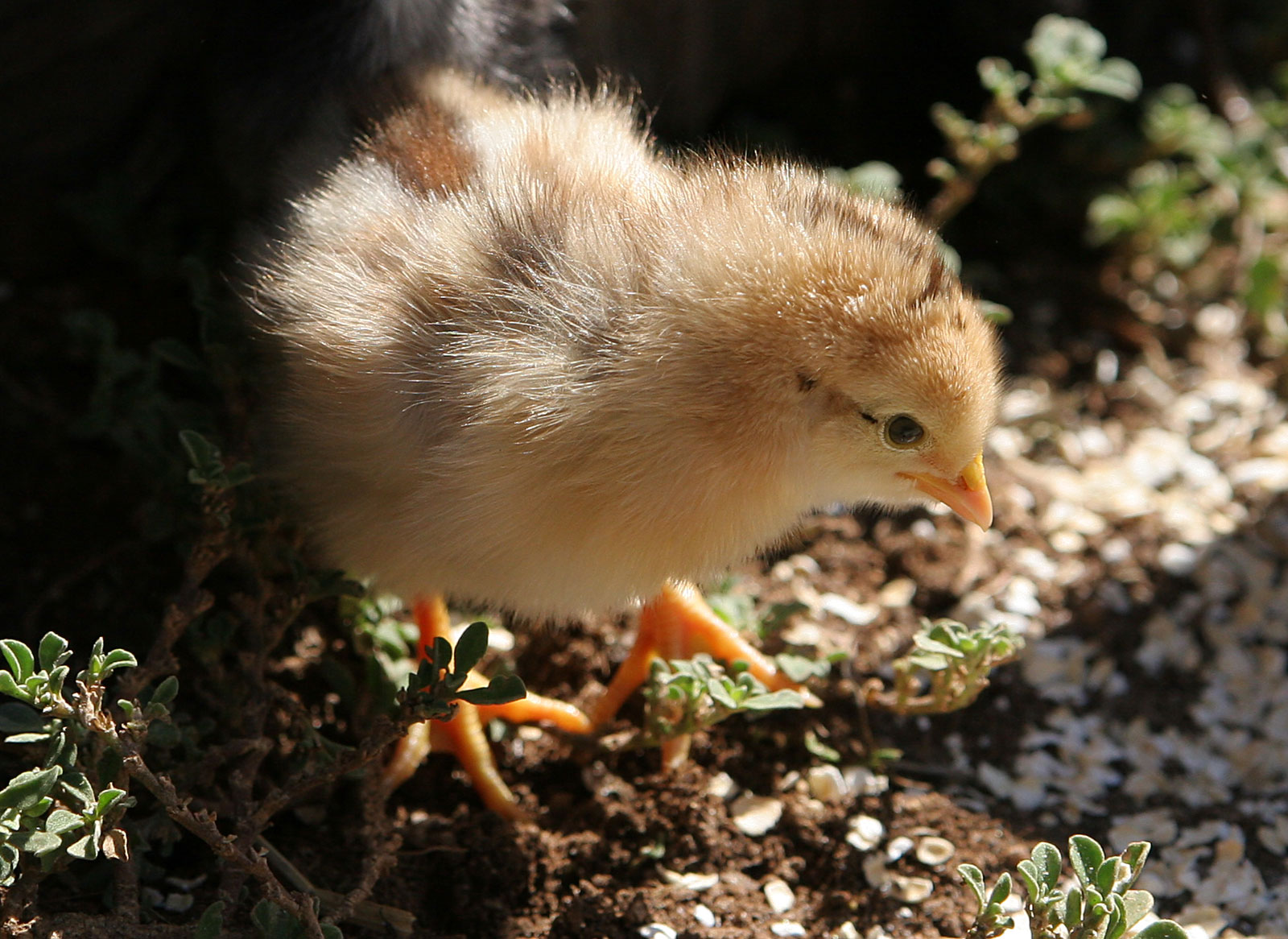
Like many precocial hatchlings, domestic chickens are already covered with a coat of downy feathers when they hatch.

The word down comes from the Old Norse word dúnn, which had the same meaning as its modern equivalent. The down feather is considered to be the most "straightforward" of all feather types. It has a short or vestigial rachis (shaft), few barbs, and barbules that lack hooks. There are three types of down: natal down, body down and powder down. Natal down is the layer of down feathers that cover most birds at some point in their early development. Precocial nestlings are already covered with a layer of down when they hatch, while altricial nestlings develop their down layer within days or weeks of hatching. Megapode hatchlings are the sole exception; they are already covered with contour feathers when they hatch. Body down is a layer of small, fluffy feathers that lie underneath the outer contour feathers on a bird's body.

=== Powder down ===
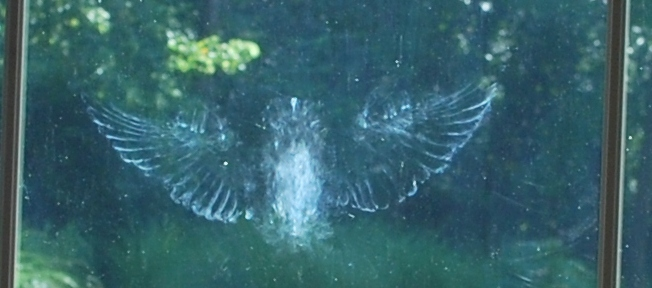
"Feather dust" left on a window after a birdstrike

Powder down, or pulviplumes, is a special type of down that occurs in a few groups of unrelated birds. In some species, the tips of the barbules on powder down feathers disintegrate, forming fine particles of keratin, which appear as a powder, or "feather dust", among the feathers. These feathers grow continuously and are not moulted. In other species, powder grains come from cells that surround the barbules of growing feathers. These specialized feathers are typically scattered among ordinary down feathers, though in some species, they occur in clusters. All parrots have powder down, with some species (including the mealy amazons) producing copious amounts. It is also found in herons and tinamous. The dust produced from powder down feathers is a known allergen in humans.

== Function ==
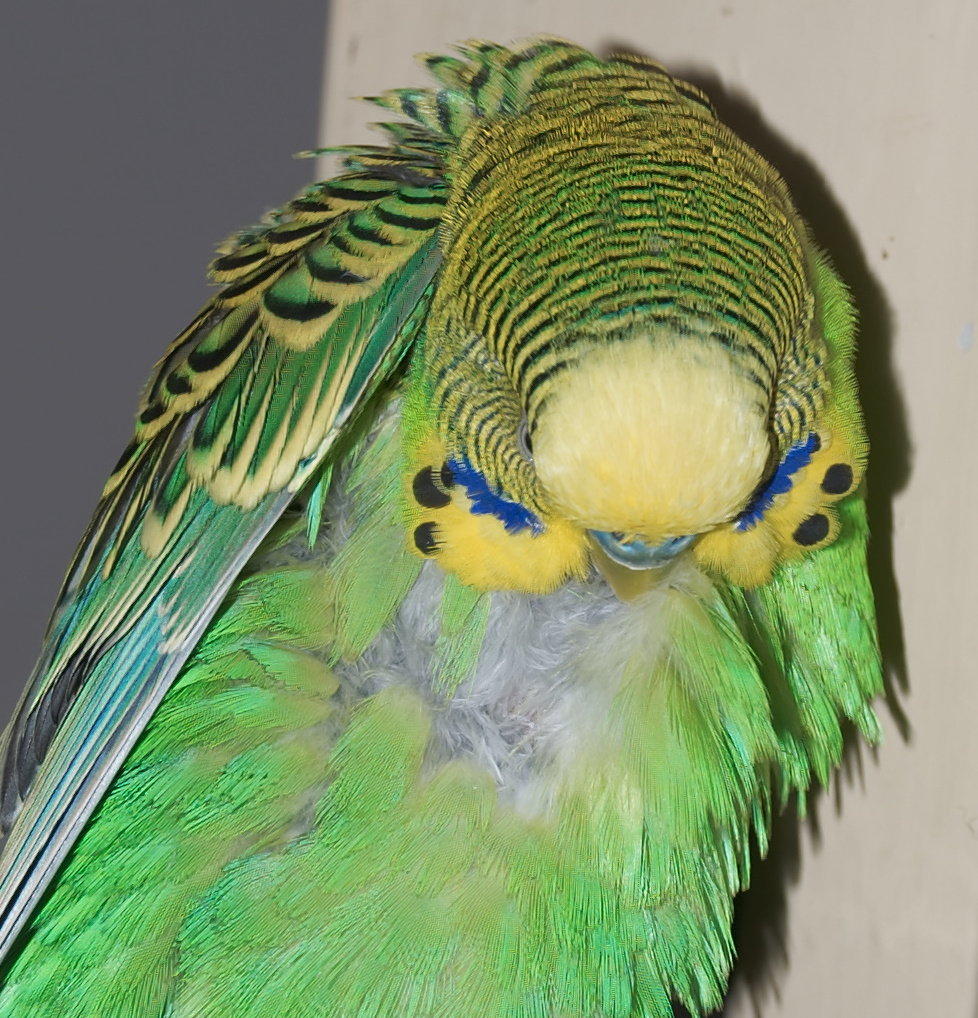
Body down feathers, like these exposed on this adult male budgerigar's back, lie underneath the contour feathers and help to insulate birds against heat loss.

The loose structure of down feathers traps air, which helps to insulate the bird against heat loss and contributes to the buoyancy of waterbirds. Species that experience annual temperature fluctuations typically have more down feathers following their autumn moult. There is some evidence that down feathers may also help to decrease the incidence of nestling cannibalism among some colonially nesting species, as the stiffness of the feathers make the young more difficult to swallow. Pollutants can reduce the efficiency of these functions. When oiled, for example, down feathers mat and clump together, which breaks down the bird's insulation and allows water to reach the skin.

Female wildfowl use down feathers plucked from their own breasts to line their scrape nests. This process performs the dual function of helping to insulate the eggs and exposing the female's brood patch—an area of bare skin, rich in blood vessels, which transmits heat very efficiently. Of the various items birds use to line their nests, down feathers provide the most effective insulation, though only when dry; wet down is the least effective insulator. Down may also help camouflage the eggs when the female is away from the nest, particularly as the birds often draw the feathers over their eggs before leaving.

Because a bird can eliminate heavy metals in its feathers and because feathers can be collected non-invasively and stored indefinitely, down feathers can be used to check for evidence of metal contamination in the bird's environment. Studies have shown a high level of correlation between the level of metal contamination in a bird's diet and the level found in its feathers, with the proportion of the chemicals found in its feathers remaining relatively constant (and relatively high for some metals).

== Mutation ==
Mutations in the genes that control the formation of down feathers have been recorded in a German White Leghorn chicken flock. Although the elements of a normal down feather are present, a hyperkeratosis of the feather's horny sheath after 16–17 days of incubation results in the sheath not splitting as it should during the final stages of the feather's growth. Because of that abnormal splitting, the bird's down appears to be matted; chicks with this condition look bristly and singed and tend to be lighter in body weight than normal chicks are.

== Human use ==
Down feathers are used by Indigenous North Americans for religious ceremonies and as powerful symbols. In the stories of some cultures, the down feathers of an eagle are important gifts given by the bird to the story's hero. In the Ghost Dance, a religious movement that has become particularly widespread among the Indigenous peoples of the Great Plains and Canadian Prairies, each dancer holds a painted feather tipped with a down feather painted with another color; the feathers are generally those of a crow, which is sacred to the Ghost Dance, or an eagle, which is ubiquitously sacred. Zuni prayer sticks are also made using eagle down. While eagle feathers belong to the Sun Priest, who plants them to the sun, other priests could use them if rain was needed, as the down is said to suggest "fleecy clouds that gather on the horizon before rain". The Hopi rub eagle down feathers over rattlesnakes collected for Snake Dances, in an effort to soothe and calm the reptiles.

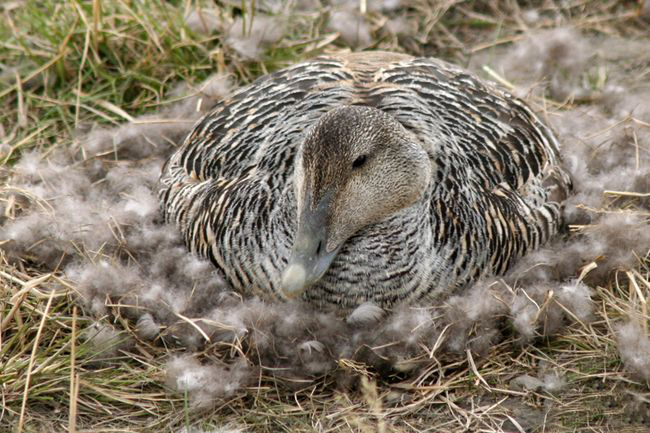
A female common eider sits on her nest, surrounded by down feathers.

Anglers who fly fish have long used the down feathers of waterfowl for the construction of fishing lures. Because they are white, down feathers can be easily dyed a variety of colours. They are used to make the bodies, tails and wing casings of the flies. Historically, much of the down used for the flies came from the wing and tail of the marabou stork; these feathers were also popular with the millinery and dressmaking trades. Though it is still called by the same name, today's "marabou" (sometimes spelled "marabout"), comes from domestic turkeys, as marabou storks are protected.

For centuries, humans across the globe have used down feathers for insulation. Russian documents from the 1600s list "bird down" among the goods sold to Dutch merchants, and communities in northern Norway began protecting the nests of eider ducks as early as 1890. Eiders are still "farmed" by people in Iceland, Scandinavia and Siberia. The birds are provided with nest sites and protected from predators, and down is collected intermittently during the nesting season without harming the nests or female ducks. The first collection is made roughly halfway through the incubation period, when some 0.75 oz (21 g) of high quality down is removed per nest. When the eggs have hatched and the young have left the area, the remaining down and breast feathers are gathered, typically resulting in another 0.75 oz (21 g) of lower quality feathers per nest. In general, 50–60 nests will produce about one kilogram (2.2 pounds) of down feathers. No more than four tonnes of eiderdown is collected from wild nests each year. Approximately 70% of that harvest is from Iceland. According to the International Down and Feather Bureau, eiderdown contributes only a small, but lucrative, portion of the world's total down production, estimated at 175,000 tonnes annually. An eiderdown duvet requires from 600 to 1,600 grams of eiderdown fill; a simple 800 gram duvet sells for about 640,000 Icelandic króna (US$5,116) as of 2021.

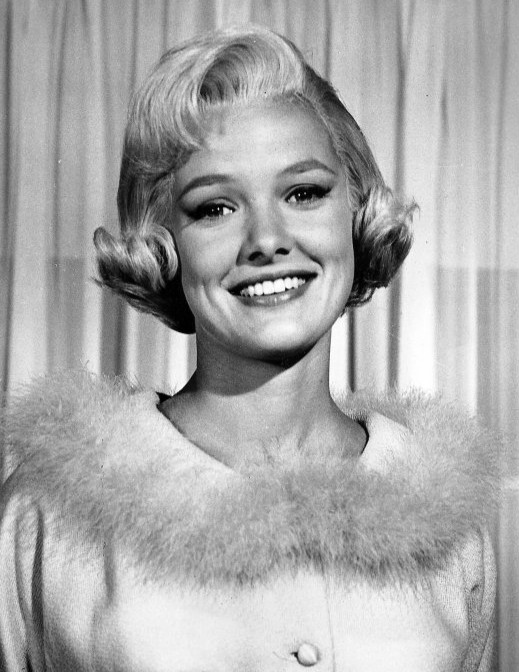
Down feathers are sometimes used as decorative trim on clothing.

In Iceland and Scandinavia, colonies of more than 5,000 birds sometimes develop in "farmed" areas, while in some protected areas of the Novaya Zemlya archipelago, nest densities exceed 13,000 per hectare (5,300/acre). On the other hand, the more nomadic indigenous peoples of Arctic Canada did not see down production as a reasonable source of income and tended to overexploit eider nests with "indifferent" collection of down feathers from the nests. Although the down feathers of various species of wildfowl, gulls and other seabirds have historically been used for insulation, most now come from domestic geese. Some 70 percent of the world's supply comes from China, typically from birds killed for their meat. Most of the rest comes from Europe and Canada, from birds harvested for meat or pâté.

A portion of the world's supply of down feathers are plucked from live birds, a practice condemned as cruel by animal welfare groups. The precise percentage of down harvested in this manner is uncertain; while some references report that it is only a small fraction of the total (less than 1% in 2011), a 2009 Swedish documentary reported that it might be as much as 50–80% of the total supply, a figure supported by IKEA and an industry representative, but disputed by organizations within the industry. The documentary also shows birds lying on the floor with large flesh wounds from the plucking, after which the wounds were stitched using a needle and thread without anesthetic. Although live-plucking is illegal in Canada, the United States and Europe, it is known to occur in two European countries (Poland and Hungary) and in China. Public sentiment against the practice has, in some countries, been strong. IKEA and clothing manufacturer Patagonia have altered product lines to eliminate the use (or possible use) of live-plucked down.

In the United States, Federal Trade Commission regulations require that any product labeled "100% Down" must contain only down feathers, while products labeled simply "Down" can contain a mixture of fiber and feathers. In addition, products labeled as "Goose Down" must contain at least 90% goose down, 10% goose feathers. Down insulation is rated by fill power, which is the number of cubic inches displaced by a given ounce of down (in^{3}/oz). To measure fill power, an ounce of down is placed into a graduated cylinder, and a small weight is dropped in on top of it; the volume below the weight indicates the fill power. Eiderdown has the highest fill power, at 1200. However, even down with a fill power as low as 550 still provides reasonably good insulation. Higher fill-power downs will thus insulate better than lower fill-power downs of the same weight. Insulation in most outdoor equipment ranges from about 400 to 900 in^{3}/oz (230–520 cm^{3}/g). Down rated 500–650 in^{3}/oz (290–380 cm^{3}/g) is warm enough and light enough for most conditions, and 800–900 in^{3}/oz (460–520 cm^{3}/g) fill is used for very lightweight and/or very cold-weather gear.

Down is warm, lightweight and packable. If well cared for, it retains its loft up to three times longer than do most synthetics. However, when it is wet, the thermal properties of down are virtually eliminated. Down forms clumps if exposed to dampness or moisture, and will mildew if left damp. In addition, it will absorb and retain odors.

Down feathers tend to become more allergenic as they age, as they become contaminated with molds and dust mites. Pillows provide the most common source of exposure, though mattresses, comforters, outerwear and upholstery can also cause problems. A Finnish study has shown that true feather allergies are rare, with most issues caused by dust mites.

== Non-avian dinosaurs ==
Feathers found in amber in western France, Canada and northeastern China suggest that some non-avian dinosaurs may have had primitive, down-like feathers.

== See also ==
- International Down and Feather Testing Laboratory
