= Fill power =

Measurement of a down product

Fill power is a measure of the loft or "fluffiness" of a down product that is loosely related to the insulating value of the down. The higher the fill power, the more air a certain weight of the down can trap, and thus the more insulating ability the down will have. Fill power is commonly given as a specific volume (the inverse of density), expressed in cubic inches per ounce. Common fill power values range from about 300 cubic inches per ounce (170 cm^{3}/g) for feathers to around 900 in^{3}/oz (520 cm^{3}/g) for the highest quality goose down. The rare and relatively expensive down of certain wild waterfowl species such as the Muscovy duck or Common eider can have higher fill powers than goose down. Higher fill powers are associated with a larger percentage of down clusters and a larger average down cluster size.

== Measurement ==
Fill power is the most frequently used measure of down quality. It involves measurements taken of a 30g sample of down in a plexiglas cylinder with a weighted piston compressing the down. The test requires controlled temperature and humidity and preparation of the sample. All other things being equal, bedding or garments made with high fill power down are lighter and more compressible than an equally warm one made with lower quality down. Poor quality down might be between 300 and 500 fill power. For down sleeping bags a lofting power of 600–650 is considered good quality, 700–750 is considered very good, and 800–950+ is considered excellent.

US 2013 norm: Cylinder diameter: 288 mm. Cylinder Height: Minimum 500 mm. Weight plate: 284 mm diameter, load weight for cylinder 94.25 g, 128 holes at 3mm. Conditioning: Steam conditioning followed by heated drying. Down quantity: 30 grams. Results expressed in cubic inches per 30 grams.

EN norm: cylinder diameter: (289 ± 1) mm, conditioning: tumble dry +2–5 days in a screen box compression cylinder: Lorch machine = mechanized cylinder weighing 94.25 grams, Mass of the sample:(20,0 ± 0,1) grams.

750+ fill is quite different from 400 fills. Almost all down commercially available is a secondary product of geese raised for consumption. It would be prohibitively expensive to raise geese for down alone. The geese that are the source for lower fill down are about four months old when they are killed for food. Down from these geese can be carefully sorted, washed, and blended, but it will never loft like really mature down. The 700+ down fill comes from a small number of birds kept for breeding purposes throughout the year. These geese molt naturally in the spring. While their down is loose it is collected by hand. It is very rare and, of course, expensive. The larger individual plumules are what gives the greater loft. The only way to get down of this quality is by careful hand selection which is the major factor in its scarcity. The higher the fill number, the warmer the product is, given that the total mass remains the same.

== Insulation and weight ==
Depending on the intended application, the highest available fill power may not be necessary. A high fill power will provide more insulating ability for a given weight of down. The warmth of a down comforter depends not only on the fill power, but also on the quantity of fill. So the difference between a comforter with 550 fill power down and a comforter with 700 fill power down is that the 700 fill power down comforter will be lighter for the same warmth rating. High fill powers are most important for weight sensitive applications such as backpacking.

Down (or any insulation) provides warmth by trapping a layer of air that separates the cold side from the warm side. A thicker layer of trapped air gives more insulation. This thickness is often called "loft." A comforter that uses 550 fill power down, for example, would have to use approximately 40%-50% greater weight of down than a similar item that uses 800 fill power down to provide the same loft.

=== European sleeping bags ===
Calculations based on fill power and loft are only approximate. The warmth of sleeping bags may be more accurately compared using European Norm (EN 13537) temperature ratings that are based on realistic independent laboratory tests. The rated temperature (in degrees Celsius) is the lowest comfortable temperature. Often a table with values will be associated indicating safe but potentially not comfortable temperatures.

=== US sleeping bags ===
In the United States, sleeping bags are sold by temperature rating (in degrees Fahrenheit). Many US sleeping bag manufacturers use non-standardized methods to establish their temperature comfort ratings which means that ratings from different manufacturers may not be comparable. Some US manufacturers use EN 13537 and others are expected to adopt it in the future.

== Washing and restoring ==
Fill power of down tends to diminish as the down gets dirty and mats. The fill power of a down article can be restored by washing the article in a washing machine with or without detergent (mild) and dried in a home dryer. Tennis balls can be added to help fluff the down. Alternatively, the washing can be skipped and the down article can be placed in the dryer with a damp rag for 10–20 minutes. The idea is to open up the matted down clusters with warm air and moisture.

== See also ==
- Down jacket
- Duvet
