= Bed sheet =

Rectangular piece of cloth or linen cotton used to cover a mattress

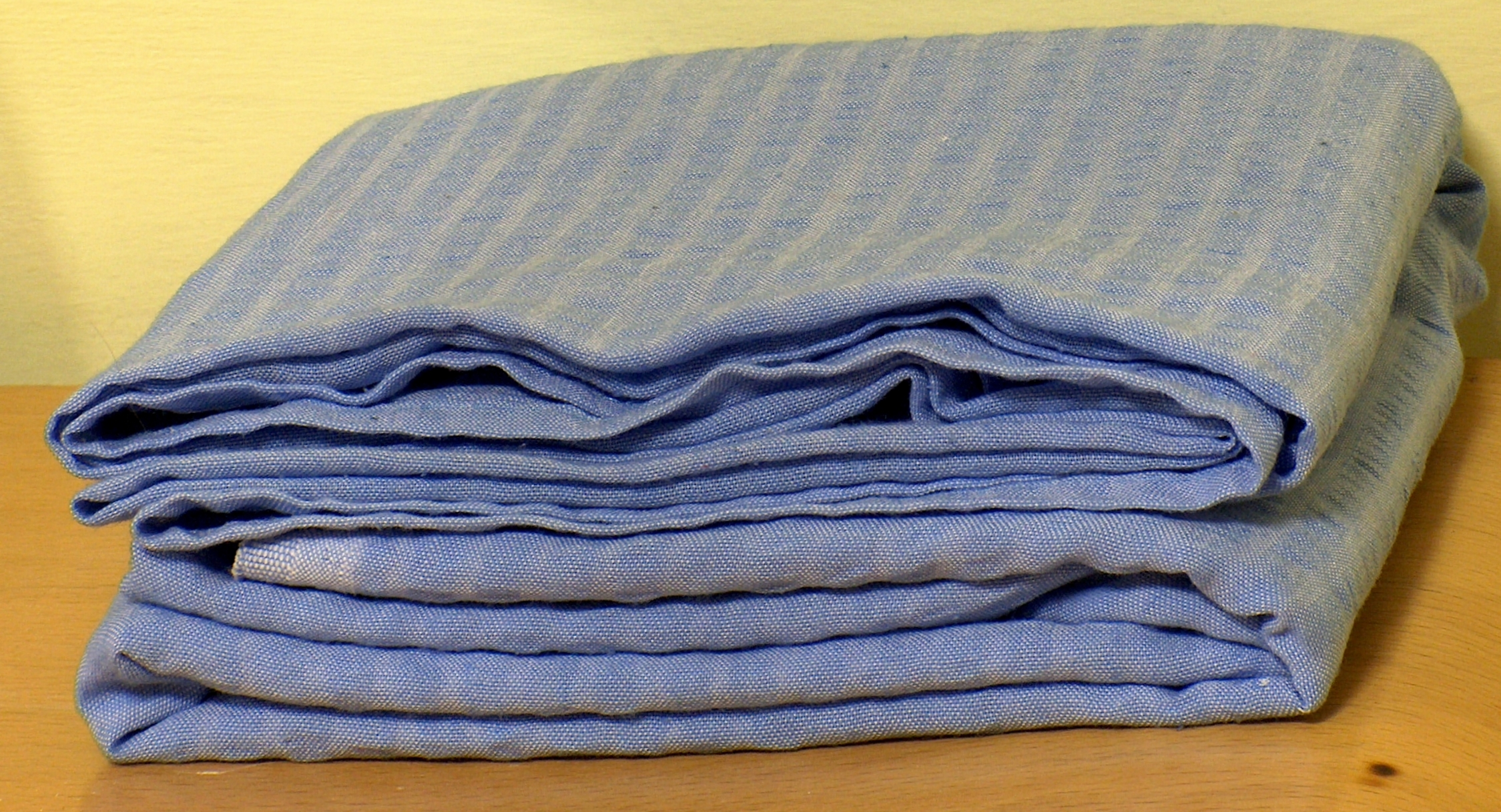
A bed sheet

A bed sheet or bedsheet is a rectangular piece of cloth used as bedding, which is larger in length and width than a mattress, and which is placed immediately above a mattress or bed, but below blankets and other bedding (such as comforters and bedspreads or sheets). A bottom sheet is laid above the mattress, and may be either a flat or fitted sheet. A top sheet, in the many countries where they are used, is a flat sheet, which is placed above a bottom sheet and below other bedding.

== History ==
Bed sheets have been used for centuries. The word sheet, meaning length of cloth, is attested by the mid-13th century as a "large square or rectangular piece of linen or cotton spread over a bed" Fitted sheets are a much more recent innovation. In the 1950's African American Bertha Berman filed a patent application for a fitted sheet that used elastic on the corners to help keep it in position. Further innovation came later when Gisele Jubinville, of Alberta, Canada, created a fitted sheet with deep mitred edges, which acted like a pocket for the mattress corners and that had elastic sides. She was granted a patent in the early 1990's and shortly after sold it for $1 million. For Switzerland, the company Schlossberg claims to have introduced the fitted sheet made of jersey (1979).

== Styles ==
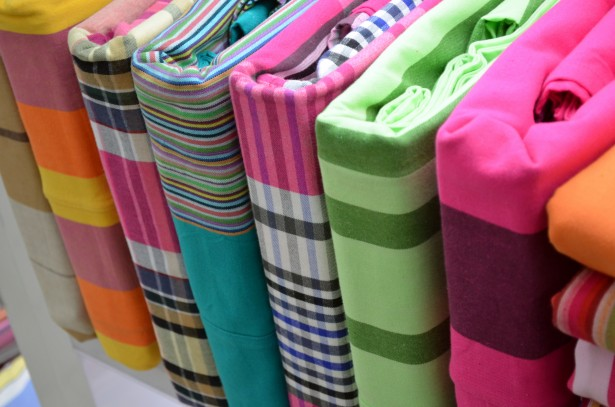
Assortment of different colored bed sheets

Bed sheets come in two main varieties: flat and fitted. A flat sheet is simply a rectangular sheet of cloth, while a fitted sheet has four corners, usually fitted with elastic and is used as a bottom sheet. The purpose of a fitted bottom sheet is to keep it from slipping off the mattress while the bed is in use. A flat bed sheet does not have elastic and instead is tucked under the mattress or can be used as a top sheet.

In the US and Canada, sheets are often sold in a four-piece set consisting of a fitted sheet, a flat sheet and two pillowcases. In China, a four-piece set consists of a duvet cover, two pillowcases and either a fitted or flat sheet. Fitted sheets are gaining popularity due to their ease of use. Use of good quality elastic make fitted sheets durable.

== Material and quality ==
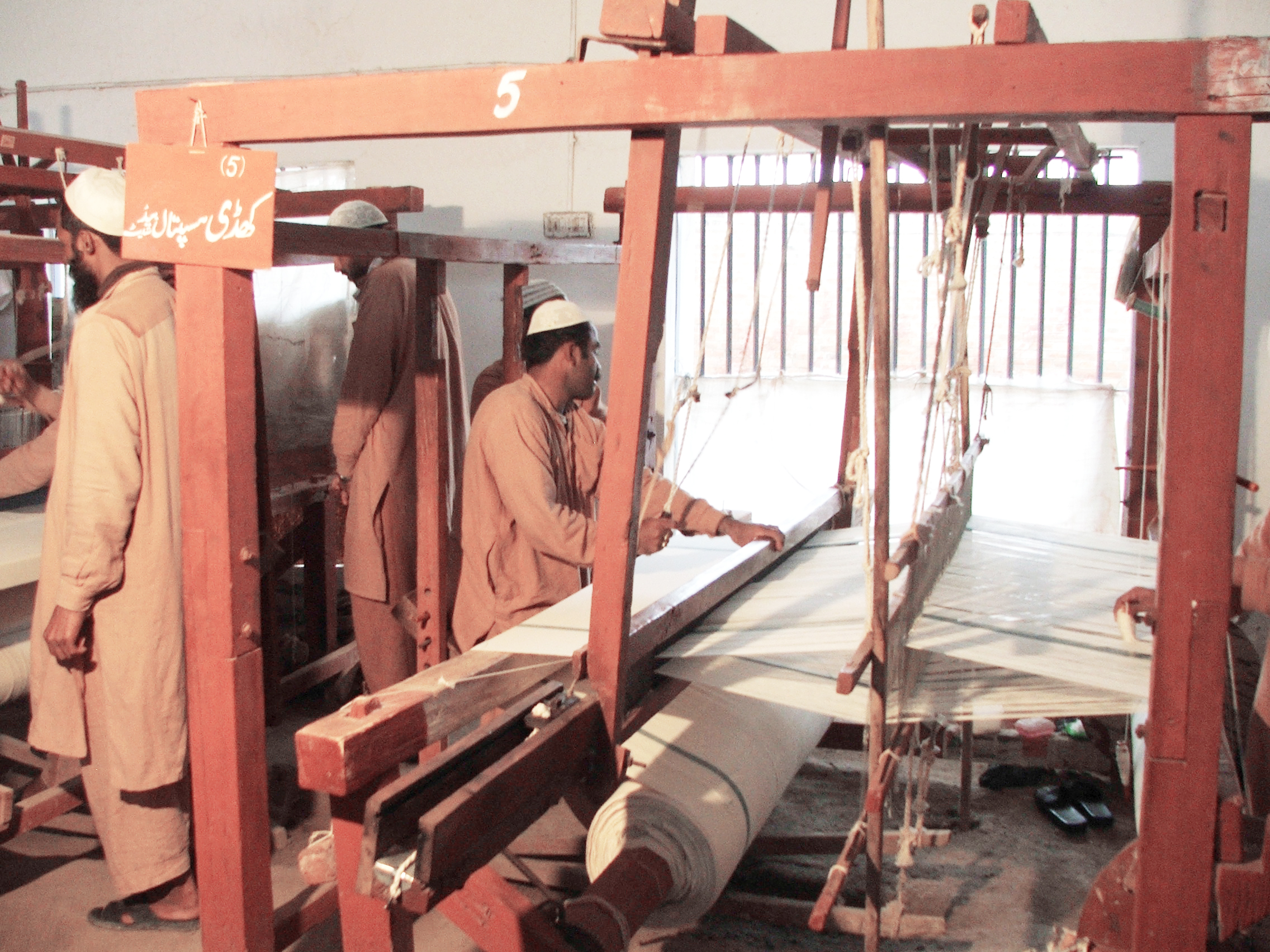
Weavers work on a hospital bed sheet on a traditional manual loom in Faisalabad, Pakistan, in 2010

Cotton and cotton blends dominate the market, the most common blend being cotton/polyester. Cotton provides absorbency and is soft, while polyester adds durability and wrinkle resistance. Other common fibers used in the manufacturing of bed sheets include linen, silk, modal, bamboo rayon, lyocell and microfiber. Materials that are known to have cooling properties include those made of lyocell, bamboo rayon, linen, hemp or silk.

Thread count measures the number of threads per square inch of fabric. Bed sheets often display this as an indication to quality. Generally, a higher thread count suggests the sheet is of superior quality but this is not the only factor to consider in regards to quality. A higher thread count means a finer thread and a tighter weave, which translates to a softer and longer lasting sheet.

Some materials are measured in grams per square meter (GSM). The higher this is, the thicker the material will be. This includes flannel, linen and microfibre, whereas silk is measured in momme (weight) or denier (weight of a single fibre). Depending on what material bed sheets are made of and the weave type, there is an ideal thread count, gsm or momme/denier for sheets.

The most common weaves used to make bed sheets include:

Percale: uses a one-under, one-over weave pattern and is known to be breathable and crisp

Sateen: uses a one-under, three- or four-over weave pattern and is known to be smooth and warm

Other sheets are made with materials that are knitted rather than woven (jersey), providing warmth. Flannel sheets are made by brushing the material, which can increase softness and warmth. Silk is hypoallergenic, so is good for people who have sensitive skin or have allergies.

Breathability of a sheet can be impacted by the material, fabric weight and how it is woven. Percale sheets are very breathable, partly due to the weave type, whereas due to the material type, polyester is not so breathable. In the main, the heavier the fabric, the less breathable it will be, but this again depends on the weave or how it is knitted. Breathability is a quality attribute people may want to consider.

== Cleaning ==
Bedsheets should be washed every one to two weeks. This will remove dust mites and allergens. It is advisable to follow the manufacturer's guidelines, as different materials may require specific washing techniques.

== See also ==
- Bed
- Bed size
- Mattress
