= International Down and Feather Testing Laboratory =

Coordinates: 40.73786°N 111.8594°W

- Established: 1978
- Research type: Unclassified
- Field of research: Down and feathers
- Staff: 100
- Location: Salt Lake City, Utah, 84105, United States
- Website: Official website

IDFL Laboratory and Institute, originally known as the International Down and Feather Testing Laboratory, is a facility based in Salt Lake City, Utah, specializing in testing down and feathers. It tests filled textiles for materials like down, feathers, synthetics, and other natural fibers, alongside auditing and inspecting the textile industry.

IDFL maintains testing laboratories and offices in the United States, Switzerland, Taiwan and China, and has over 150 employees, many serving as testing analysts. Of the organizations which certified its laboratories are the IDFB, EDFA, and DPSC. The testing standard being set by textile industry organizations such as AATCC, ADFC, ASTM, CFDIA, DAC, EDFA, IABFLO, IDFB, and TDFA.

== History ==
IDFL was founded in Salt Lake City, Utah in 1978 by Wilford Lieber Sr. and his wife Mary Jean. Lieber had previously worked for the state of Utah in product regulation and at the request of companies in the down and feather industry.

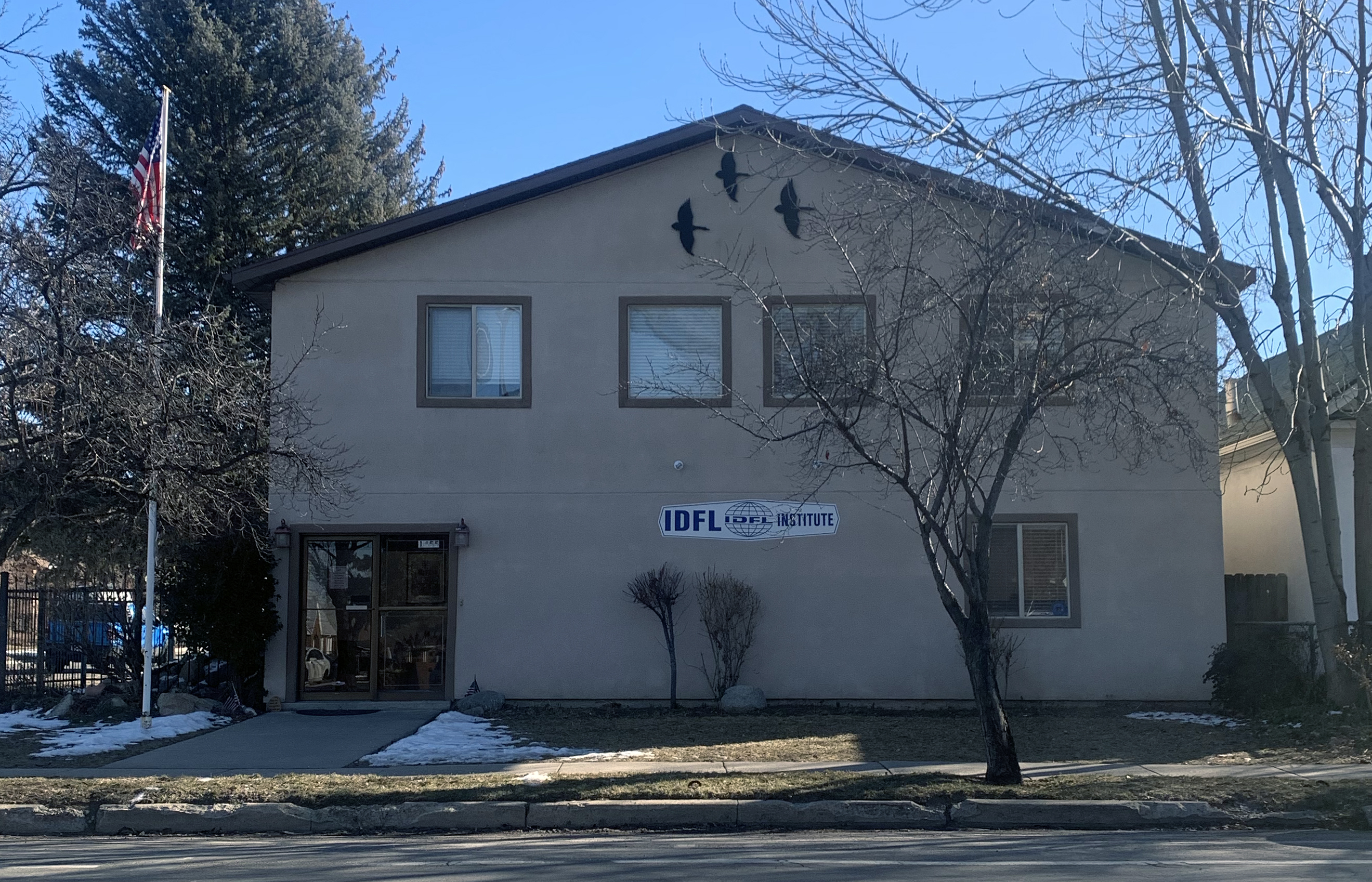
Salt Lake City Headquarters of International Down and Feather Testing Laboratory

Wilf Lieber Jr. is the current CEO of IDFL Laboratory and Institute and serves as an associate member of various organizations such as the IDFB, ADFC, EDFA and CFDIA.

Over time IDFL gradually expanded into other areas. In the 1980s, it began to offer consulting services and fabric testing. In the 1990s, IDFL began factory inspection services as well as research services. In the 2000s, IDFL began synthetic filling testing, finished product inspection services, non-down filling testing, and audit services. In 2002, IDFL opened an office in Frauenfeld, Switzerland. In 2003, IDFL opened an office in Hangzhou, China.

== Down and feather testing ==
After testing, companies in the down and feather industry may acquire sterilization permits. IDFL is among the establishments which perform these tests and inspect factories. Testing involves checking feather composition, content analysis, and species type as well as numerous other quality factors. Material is also graded for cleanliness by examining the fat and oil percentages, pH levels, odor, turbidity, and other purity factors. All down and feather material is double tested.

IDFL tests materials according to the following standards:

Testing Standard	Country
AS	Australia
ASTM	International
Canada	Canada
CNS	Taiwan
EN	Europe
GB	China
Gost	Russia
IDFB	International
JIS	Japan
KS	Korea
USA 2000	United States
VSB	Switzerland

== Audit services ==
IDFL consults with clients by conducting traceability audits of supply chains primarily for CSR topics like live plucking. IDFL consults or performs audits under different licenses such as the following:

- IDFL internal standard, this standard began in 2008 and has gone through different revisions since. It has options of scope which allow tracing a particular leg, location or the whole of a supply chain.
- Traumpass standard, this is a Germany-based standard that translates as 'dream standard' and is developed by the German Down and Feather Association.
- Downpass standard is a standard that is based all of European Union Directives. It contains a quality element verifying the quality of the material, and in addition, has the actual audit process tracing material from a product to the source of the raw materials. This standard is strongest in Europe and countries with higher European influence, but is gaining traction in other North American markets.
- RDS (Responsible Down Standard) was developed with many discussions in the OIA (Outdoor Industry Association), but was then completed by The North Face and then strategically gifted to the Textile Exchange The RDS standard has claimed to save.
- TDS (Traceable Down Standard), This standard was developed by Patagonia to address needs in their supply chain and was also gifted to NSF (National Safety Foundation). It was also seen as a way for Patagonia to not be outdone by competitor TNF.

Audit services generally involve tracing materials from finished goods back to their original sources through various means, such as invoices or an audit system that tracks the chain of custody. This process may also involve visiting supply chains and factories to verify that down and feather materials are not sourced from live plucking or Foie gras production, as well as inspecting other elements such as sterilization procedures.

Additionally, IDFL is exploring the use of isotope technology to enhance the accuracy of traceability audits.

== Other services ==
IDFL provides inspection services on behalf of clients in order to confirm products being imported have been manufactured according to specifications and labeling standards. IDFL also provides training, seminars and other consulting work.
