= Duvet day =

Unplanned day off work

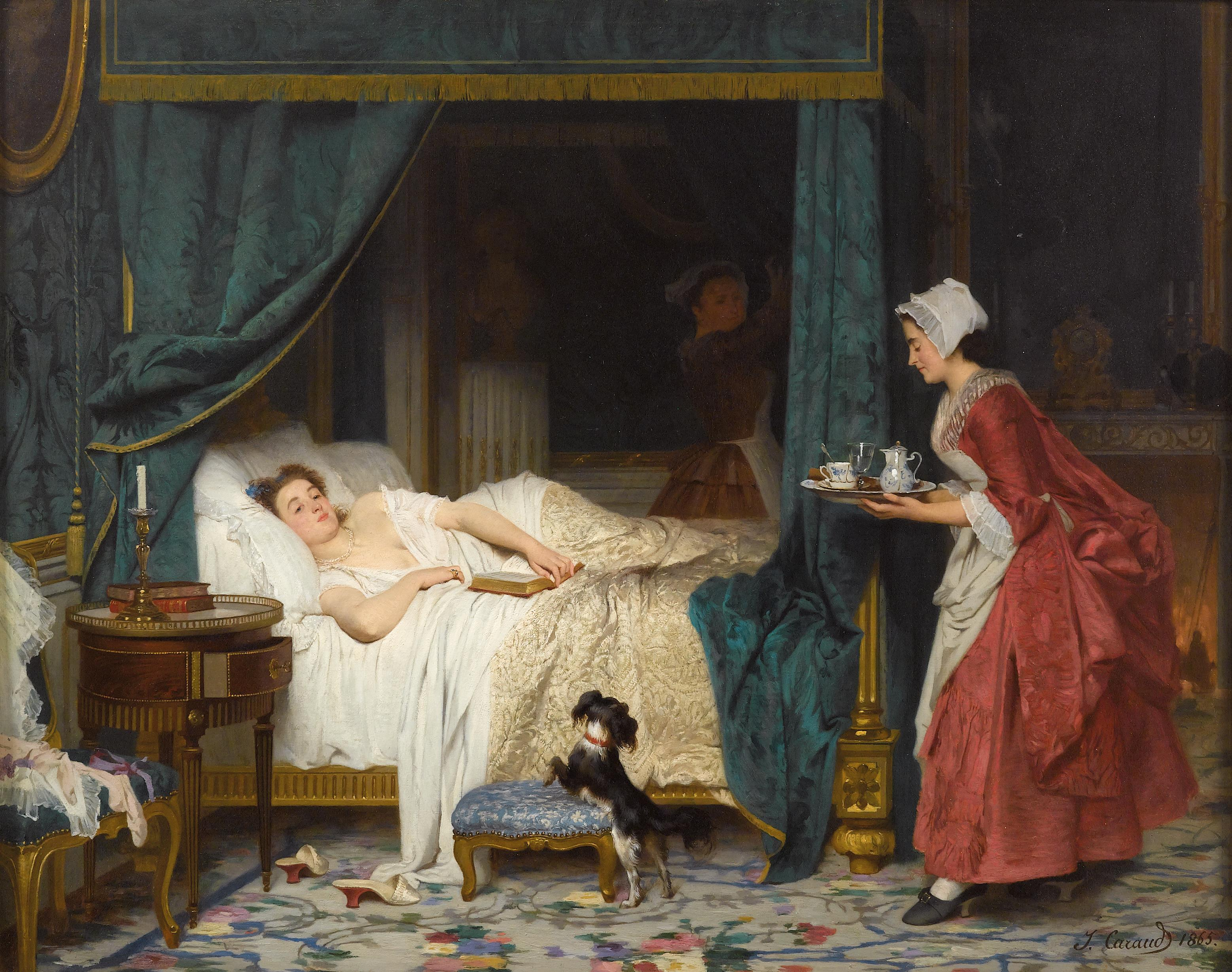
Joseph Caraud Am Morgen 1865

A duvet day is a formal allowance of time off given by some employers, most commonly in the United Kingdom and United States. It differs from holiday allowance in that no prior notice is needed. Employees receive an allocation of days where if they do not want to go to work for any reason they can use a duvet day. The name is a reference to the item of bedding.

Duvet days were originally given to employees by UK company August One Communications in 1997, the term was invented by Nigel George. His wife Rebecca was at the time responsible for the company's HR. The idea has grown in popularity as some companies aim to address the changing work-life climate where people work longer hours. It can be stipulated formally in a contract of employment and is considered part of the remunerations package along with holiday allowance. The term has also since become used by people to reference taking a day off work for no normally accepted reason (such as mild sickness, grievance or holiday) even if they have no official duvet day entitlement with their employer.

== See also ==
- Bed rotting
