= Silk comforter =

Type of bed covering

A silk comforter (絲綿被) is a bed covering, most often used as a duvet, and also commonly referred to as a silk duvet, silk quilt, or silk blanket. Originally used and made in China, since the late 20th century, silk comforters have become more common in Western market areas. Their increasing popularity stems from a combination of factors, including their thermal properties, their light weight, and their natural hypoallergenic properties. The opening of the Chinese market to the world since the 1990s has also played a significant role in the spread of silk comforters, as China is both the world's biggest silk producer and silk comforter manufacturer.

== Production and processing ==
Silk comes from the cocoons of the silkworm, which feeds off mulberry trees in subtropical climates. When the cocoon is boiled, the hard cocoon becomes a loose ball of strong, flexible filament measuring over 1,000 meters. Usually, this ball is uncoiled and wrapped on a spindle for use in the textile industry. Silk is used for making everything from clothing to rugs. During silk comforter production, however, the silk filament is not unraveled, but rather stretched into a flat tangled web and layered to form silk floss, which will fill the comforter.

The cocoons are first boiled to loosen the sericin holding the filaments together and kill the silkworm. Each cocoon is stretched by hand on a U-shaped wooden rack, and the ball of thread becomes a sheet of tangled fibers. This sheet is then hand-stretched again on a larger rack, along with several other cocoons to make a thick, cottony bundle called silk floss. It takes hundreds of these bundles to make a silk comforter.

Once enough silk cocoons have been stretched into bundles, the comforter begins to take shape. Workers grab the edges of the bundle and stretch it wide to match the dimensions of the desired comforter, and layer by layer the comforter begins to take shape. It can take anywhere between 100 and 400 of these thin layers to make a comforter, depending on bed dimensions and desired thickness. Since it takes many cocoons to make each layer, a silk comforter may be composed of thousands of silk cocoons.

Once the silk fiber layers are stacked together, they are sealed inside silk or cotton fabrics and the comforter is complete. The result is extremely light-weight despite the silk comforter's thickness. Silk comforters provide excellent insulating properties similar to down, but tend to be less bulky than down duvets. Silk is a breathable fabric, making silk comforters comfortable in a wide temperature range. Thin silk comforters are used even in the summer.

In the U.S., silk comforters are imported mainly from China or Taiwan and are priced about the same as down comforters. Unlike other natural fibers used in comforters, silk is naturally hypoallergenic, and it does not require any processing chemicals during the manufacturing process. A silk comforter is a good alternative for people who are allergic to goose down comforters.

== Silk comforter care ==
Silk comforters are easy to care for: they only need to be dried under the sun twice a year to maintain their freshness. If more thorough cleaning is required, a silk comforter should be dry-cleaned, since the silk floss layers are damaged by contact with water.

They may have a fairly strong smell to them, attributed to the remaining pupa. There is some difference of opinion about how easy it is to get rid of the smell.

== Cost in China ==
In November 2017, at a large government silk products store in Shanghai, the cost for a 100% silk queen-sized 2 kg silk quilt (duvet, comforter) had the 'fixed price' of Yuan 1880 or approximately U.S. $285 (there are no additional costs). Government fixed-price stores, which one can apparently trust as regards quality, sometimes allow customers to bargain. The price is composed of two parts: one is the silk filler, and the other is the cotton cover.
