= List of English words of French origin (D–I) =

The pervasiveness of words of French origin that have been borrowed into English is comparable to that of borrowings from Latin.

== D ==
- dace
- dagger
- daguerreotype
- dainty, Old Fr. deintie
- dais, Old Fr. dais
- dally
- dalmatic, Old Fr. dalmatique
- damage, Old Fr. damage
- dame
- damn, Fr. damner
- damnable
- damnation
- damsel
- dance
- dandelion
- danger
- dangerous
- darnel
- dart
- date
- daub
- daunt
- dean, Old Fr. deien, compare Mod. Fr. doyen
- debacle
- debar
- debark
- debase
- debatable
- debate
- debauch
- debauchee
- debilitation
- debility
- debit
- debonair
- debridement
- debris
- debt, Old Fr. dete, compare Mod. Fr. dette
- debtor, Old Fr. detor, relatinized in Modern Fr. débiteur (from debitor)
- debut
- debutant
- debutante
- decade
- decadence
- decadent
- decamp
- decant
- decapitate
- decapitation
- decay
- decease
- deceit
- deceive
- decent
- decentralisation
- deception
- deceptive
- decide
- decider
- decilitre
- decimetre
- decision
- decisive
- declaim
- declamation
- declarant
- declaration
- declarative
- declare
- déclassé
- declination
- decline
- declivity
- decoction
- décolletage
- décolleté
- decompose
- décor or decor
- decorative
- decoupage
- decouple
- decrease
- decree
- decrepit
- decrepitude
- decry
- decuple
- dedication
- deduction
- deface
- defamation, Old Fr. diffamacion, compare Mod. Fr. diffamation
- defamatory
- defame
- default, Old Fr. defaute, compare Mod. Fr. défaut
- defeasance
- defeat, Old Fr. desfait, pp. of desfaire, compare Mod. Fr. défaite
- defect
- defective
- defence or defense
- defend
- defendant
- defendor
- defensible
- defensive
- defer
- deference
- deferent
- defiance
- deficit
- defile
- define
- definition
- definitive
- defloration
- deflower
- deforest
- deforestation
- deform
- deformation
- deformity
- defraud
- defray
- defrock
- defunct
- defy
- degeneration
- deglutition
- degradation
- degrade
- degree
- deific
- deign
- deity
- déjà vu
- deject
- dejection
- delay, Old Fr. deslaier, compare Mod. Fr. délai
- delectable
- delectation
- delegate
- deliberation
- deliberative
- delicious
- delight
- delimit
- delimitation
- delinquent
- deliver
- deliverance
- delivery
- deluge
- de luxe or deluxe
- demand
- demarche
- demeanor
- dement
- demerit
- demesne
- demimonde
- demise
- demission
- demitasse
- démodé
- demoiselle
- demolish
- demolition
- demonetization
- demonstration
- demonstrative
- demoralize
- demur
- demure
- demurrage
- demurrer
- denationalize
- denature
- denier
- denim
- denizen
- denomination
- denote
- denouement
- denounce
- dense
- density
- dental
- dentifrice
- denture
- denudation
- denude
- deny
- deodand
- dépanneur
- depart
- department
- departmental
- departure
- depeche
- depend
- dependant
- dependence
- depiction
- depilatory
- deplorable
- deplore
- deploy, Fr. déployer
- deployment
- deport
- deportation
- deportment
- depose
- deposition
- depot
- deprave
- deprecation
- deprecative
- depredation
- depress
- depression
- deprive
- deputation
- depute
- deputy
- deracinate
- derail
- derailleur
- derailment
- derange
- derangement
- deride
- de rigueur
- derision
- derivation
- derivative
- derive
- derogation
- derrière
- descant
- descend, Old Fr. descendre
- descendant
- descension
- descent
- describe
- description
- descry
- desecrate
- desert, Old Fr. desert
- desertion
- deserve
- deshabille
- desiccation
- designation
- desirable
- desire
- desirous
- desist
- desolation
- despair
- desperation
- despise
- despite
- despoil
- dessert
- destine
- destiny
- destitution
- destrier
- destroy
- destroyer
- destruction
- destructive
- desuetude
- detach
- detachment (Fr. détachement)
- detail (Fr. détail)
- detain (Old Fr. detenir)
- détente
- detention
- deterge
- detergent
- deterioration
- determination
- determinative
- determine
- detest
- detestable
- detestation
- detonation
- detour
- detract
- detraction
- detractor
- detriment
- deuce, from deux (two)
- devastation
- develop
- development
- deviation
- device (Old Fr. devis)
- devise
- devoid
- devoir
- devotion
- devour (Old Fr. devorer)
- devout (Old Fr. devot)
- dexterity
- diet
- differ
- difference
- different
- difficulty
- dig
- digestible
- digestion
- digestif
- digestive
- dignity (Old Fr. dignite)
- dilatation
- dilate
- diligence
- diligent
- dime, Old Fr. disme "a tenth part", compare Mod. Fr. dîme
- diminish
- diminution
- diminutive
- dine
- dinner
- direction (Fr. direction)
- director
- dirigible, Fr. dirigeable
- disaccustom
- disadvantage
- disagree
- disagreeable
- disallow
- disappoint (Fr. desappointer)
- disarm (Old Fr. desarmer)
- disaster
- disastrous
- disavow
- disband
- disburse
- discern
- discernable
- discernment
- discharge
- discipline
- disclaim
- disclaimer
- disclose
- discolour
- discomfit
- discomfiture
- discomfort
- disconcert
- discontinuance
- discontinue
- discord
- discordant
- discothèque or discothèque, thus disco
- discount
- discountenance
- discourage
- discourse
- discover (Old Fr. descovrir)
- discreet
- discretion
- discursive
- discussion
- disdain
- disease
- disenchant
- disenfranchise
- disengage
- disfavour
- disfigure
- disgorge
- disgrace
- disguise(Old Fr. desguisier)
- disgust
- dishabille
- dishevel
- dishonest
- dishonesty
- dishonour
- disillusion
- disinclination
- disinfect
- disinfectant
- disinter
- disjoint
- disjunction
- dislocation
- dislodge
- disloyal
- disloyalty
- dismal
- dismantle
- dismay
- dismember
- disobedience
- disobedient
- disobey
- disoblige
- disorder
- disorganize
- disorient
- disparage
- disparagement
- disparity
- dispensation
- dispense
- dispenser
- disperse
- dispersion
- displace
- display
- displease
- displeasure
- disport, Old Fr. desporter
- disposable
- dispose
- disposition
- dispossess
- disprove
- disputation
- dispute
- dissension
- dissever
- dissimulation
- dissociation
- dissolution
- dissonance
- dissonant
- dissuade
- distance
- distant
- distemper
- distention
- distill
- distillery
- distinct
- distinction
- distinctive
- distingue
- distinguish
- distress
- distribution
- distributive
- district
- disturb
- disturbance
- disunion
- disuse
- ditty
- diuretic
- diverse
- diversify
- diversion
- diversity
- divert
- divest
- dividend
- divination
- divine
- divinity
- divisible
- division
- divorce
- divorcee
- docile
- docility
- doctor
- doctrinaire
- doctrine
- document
- doleful
- dolmen, Fr. dolmin also dolmen, perhaps incorrect transcription of Cornish tolmen
- dolomite
- dolorous
- domain
- dome
- domestic
- domicile
- dominant
- domination
- dominion
- domino
- donation
- donor
- dormant
- dormer
- dorsal
- dossier
- double
- double entendre
- doublet
- doubloon
- doubt
- douche
- dowager
- dower
- dowry
- doyen
- doyenne
- dozen, from Old Fr. dozaine, compare modern Fr. douzaine
- drab
- dragoman
- dragon
- dragoon
- drape
- draper
- drapery
- dress (Old Fr. dresser)
- dressage
- dresser
- droll
- drollery
- dropsy, Old Fr. idropsie
- drug
- druid, Old Fr. druide, from Latin druidae, from Gaulish
- duality
- dub
- dubitation
- ducal
- ducat
- duchess
- duchy
- ductile
- due (Old Fr. deu, pp. of devoir)
- duet
- du jour
- duke
- dulcet
- dulcimer
- dune
- dungeon
- dupe
- duplication
- duplicity
- durability
- durable
- durance
- duration
- duress
- during (Old Fr. durer, compare endure)
- duty (Anglo-Fr. duete from Old Fr. deu)
- duvet

== E ==
- eager, Old Fr. aigre
- eagle, Old Fr.egle, compare modern Fr. aigle
- ease, Old Fr. aise
- easement
- easy, Old Fr. aisie, compare modern Fr. aisé
- eau de toilette
- ebriety
- ecarte
- echelon, Fr. échelon
- éclair or éclair
- éclat
- eclectic
- eclipse
- écorché
- ecru
- ecstasy, Old Fr.estaise, compare modern Fr. extase
- écu
- edict
- edification
- edifice
- edify
- edition
- education
- efface
- effect
- effectual
- effervescence
- efficacy
- efficient
- effigy
- effleurage
- efflorescence
- effort
- effrontery
- effuse
- effusion
- egalitarian
- eglantine
- egret
- ejaculation
- ejection
- elan
- elapse
- elastic
- elation
- election
- elegance
- elegant
- element
- elementary
- elevation
- eligible
- elite or élite
- eloign
- elope
- elopement
- eloquence
- eloquent
- elucidate
- email
- emancipation
- embalm
- embark
- embarkation
- embarras
- embarrass
- embarrassment
- embassy
- embattle
- embellish
- embezzle
- embonpoint
- emboss
- embouchure
- embrace
- embrasure
- embroider
- embroidery
- embroil
- emerge
- emergence
- emery
- emigre or émigré
- eminence
- eminent
- emir, Fr. émir, colloquial pronunciation of Ar. amir "commander"
- emissary
- emission
- emollient
- emolument
- emotion
- empanel
- emperor (Old Fr. empereor)
- empire
- emplacement
- employ (Middle Fr. employer)
- empress
- emprise
- emulation
- emulsion
- enamel
- enamour
- en bloc
- enceinte
- enchant
- enchanter
- enchantment
- enclave
- enclose
- encore
- encounter
- encourage, from Old Fr. encoragier, compare modern Fr. encourager
- encouragement
- encroach
- encrust
- encumber
- encumbrance
- endeavour or endeavor
- endive
- endorse
- endow
- endue
- endurance
- endure (Old Fr. endurer)
- enemy, Old Fr. enemi, compare modern Fr. ennemi
- energy (Fr. énergie)
- enervation
- enfant terrible
- enfeeble
- enfilade
- enforce
- enforcement
- enfranchise
- engage
- engagement
- engender
- engine
- engineer
- engorge
- engrain
- engross
- enhance
- enjambment
- enjoin
- enjoy (Old Fr. enjoir)
- enlace
- enlarge
- en masse
- enmity, from Old Fr. enemistié, compare modern Fr. inimitié
- ennoble
- ennui
- enormity
- en passant
- enrage
- enrich, Old Fr. enrichir
- enroll
- enrollment
- en route
- ensample
- ensemble
- ensign
- ensue
- en suite or ensuite
- ensure
- entente
- enter, Old Fr. entrer
- enterprise
- entertain
- enthrone, M.E. enthronize, from Old Fr. introniser
- entice
- enticement
- entire
- entitle
- entomb, Old Fr. entomber
- entourage
- entrails
- entrain
- entrant
- entrap
- entreat
- entrée
- entrepot
- entrepreneur
- entry
- enumeration
- envelop
- envelope, Fr. enveloppe
- envenom
- enviable
- envious
- environ, Old Fr. environer
- environs
- envisage, Fr. envisager
- envoy, Fr. envoyé
- envy, Old Fr. envie
- epaulet or epaulette, Fr. épaulette
- épée or épée
- equality, from Old French equalité, compare modern Fr. égalité
- equanimity
- equation
- equerry
- equidistant
- equilibrate
- equinox
- equip
- equipage, Fr.équipage
- equipment, Fr. équipement
- equitable
- equity, Old Fr. équité
- equivalence
- erectile
- ergot
- ermine, Old Fr. ermine, compare Modern Fr. hermine
- erode, Fr. éroder
- erosion, Fr. érosion
- errant
- erratic
- erroneous
- eruption
- escadrille
- escalade
- escallop
- escapade
- escape
- escargots
- escarole
- escarp
- escarpment
- escheat
- eschew
- esclavage
- escort
- escritoire
- escrow
- escutcheon
- espadrille
- espalier
- especial
- espionage
- esplanade
- espousal
- espouse
- esprit
- espy
- esquire
- essay
- essence
- establish, Old Fr. establiss-, prp. stem of establir
- estaminet
- estate (Old Fr. estat)
- esteem
- estimable
- estimation
- estop
- estoppel
- estrange
- etagere
- eternal
- eternity
- ether
- etiquette
- etude
- etui
- evacuation
- evacuee
- evade
- evagation
- evaluate
- evaluation
- evanescent
- evaporation, Old Fr. évaporation
- evasion, Fr. évasion
- evasive
- event
- eventual
- eviction
- evidence
- evident
- evince
- ewer
- exaction
- exactitude
- exalt
- exaltation
- examination
- examine
- example
- exceed
- excellence
- excellent
- except
- exception
- excess
- excessive
- exchange
- exchequer
- excise
- excision
- excitation
- excite
- exclaim
- exclamation
- excretion
- excusable
- excuse
- execrable
- execute
- execution
- executive
- executor
- exemplar
- exemplary
- exemplification
- exempt
- exemption
- exercise
- exhale
- exhibition (Old Fr. exhibicion)
- exhort
- exhortation
- exhumation
- exhume
- exigence
- exile
- exist
- existence
- existentialist
- expand
- expatriate
- expatriation
- expectant
- expectation
- expedience
- expedient
- expedition
- expense
- experience
- experiment
- expert
- expertise
- expiation
- expiration
- expire, Middle Fr. expirer
- explication
- explicit
- exploit, Old Fr. esploit, compare Mod. Fr. exploiter
- exploitation
- exploration
- explore
- explosion
- expose, Middle Fr. exposer
- exposé or expose
- exposition
- expound
- express
- expression
- expressive
- expugn
- expulsion
- extend
- extension
- extent
- extermination
- extern
- external
- extraction, Old Fr. estraction, compare Mod. Fr. extraction
- extradition
- extraordinaire
- extravagance
- extreme
- extremity
- extrinsic
- exuberance
- exuberant
- exult
- exultation

== F ==
- fable
- fabric, Middle Fr. fabrique
- fabrication
- fabulous
- facade
- face
- facet
- facetious
- facial
- facile
- facilitate
- facility
- faction
- factor
- factory
- faculty
- fade
- faggot
- faience, Fr. faïence
- fail, Old Fr. failir, compare Mod. Fr. faillir
- failure
- faineant
- faint
- fair (n.), Anglo-Fr. feyre, from Old Fr. feire, compare Mod. Fr. foire
- fairy, Old Fr. faerie, compare Mod. Fr. féerie
- fait accompli
- faith
- falchion
- falcon
- falconer
- falconry
- false
- falsify
- falsity
- fame
- familial
- familiar
- familiarity
- famine
- famish
- famous
- fanfare
- fantastic
- fantasy, Old Fr. fantaisie
- farce
- fardel
- farm
- farmer
- farrier
- farthingale
- fascinate
- fashion, Old Fr. façon
- fatal
- fatality
- fatigue
- fatuity
- faubourg
- faucet
- fault (Old Fr. faute)
- faux
- faux ami
- faux pas
- favour or favor
- favourable or favorable
- favourite or favorite
- fawn (n.), Old Fr. faon
- fay
- feal
- fealty
- feasance
- feasible
- feast (Old Fr. feste)
- feat
- feature
- febrifuge
- feculent
- fecund
- federal
- federation
- fee
- feeble
- feign
- feint, Old Fr. feint
- felicity, Old French felicite, compare modern Fr. félicité
- felon, Old French felon, compare modern Fr. félon
- felony, Old French felonie, compare modern Fr. félonie
- female (Old Fr. femelle)
- feme covert
- feme sole
- feminine, Old Fr. femenin, compare Mod. Fr. féminin
- femme fatale
- fennel
- fer de lance
- feral
- ferial
- ferment
- ferocity
- ferret
- ferrule
- fertile
- fertilisation
- fertilise
- fertility
- fervent
- fervour
- festal
- fester
- festival
- festive
- festivity
- festoon
- fete
- feu de joie
- feud
- feudal
- feuilleton
- fiancé
- fiancée
- fibre
- fiche
- fichu
- fiction
- fictive
- fidelity
- fief
- fierce
- fig
- figuration
- figurative
- figure
- figurine
- filbert
- file
- filet
- filial
- filiation
- filigree
- fillet, compare filet
- film noir
- filter
- filtration
- final
- finality
- finance
- financier
- fin de siecle
- fine (Old Fr. fin)
- finesse
- finish
- finitude
- firm (adj.), Old Fr. ferm, compare Mod. Fr. ferme
- fiscal
- fissure
- fix
- flagellation
- flageolet
- flagitious
- flagon
- flagrant
- flair
- flambé
- flambeau
- flamboyant
- flame
- flan
- flaneur
- flange
- flank
- flatter
- flattery
- flatulence
- flatulent
- flavour or *flavor
- flèche
- flechette
- fleuret
- flexibility
- flexible
- floral
- floret, Old Fr. florette, compare modern Fr. fleurette
- florid
- florin
- floss
- flotsam
- flounder
- flour
- flourish, Old Fr. floriss-
- flower, Old Fr. flor, compare Mod. Fr. fleur
- fluidity
- flume
- flush
- flute
- flux
- foible
- foie gras
- foil
- foliage (Fr. feuillage)
- foliation
- follies
- folly (Old Fr. folie)
- foment
- fondant
- fondue
- font, Fr. fonte
- fontanelle
- fool, Old Fr. fol
- forage
- foray
- force
- force majeure
- forcible
- forecastle
- foreclose
- foreign (Old Fr. forain)
- forest (Old Fr. forest)
- forester
- forestry
- forfeit
- forge
- form
- formality
- formation
- formative
- formidable
- formulary
- fornication
- fort
- forte
- fortification
- fortify
- fortitude
- fortress
- fortune
- fosse
- fossil
- found (Old Fr. founder)
- founder
- foundry
- fountain, Old Fr. fontaine
- foyer
- fracas
- fractal
- fraction, from Old French, compare modern Fr. fraction
- fracture
- fragile
- fragility
- fragrance
- frail
- frailly
- framboise
- franc
- franchise
- frangible
- frangipane
- frank, Old Fr. franc
- frankincense
- frap
- frappé
- fraternisation or fraternization
- fraternise or fraternize
- fraternity
- fraud
- fraudulent
- fray
- frenetic
- frenzy
- fret
- friar
- fricassee
- frieze, Middle Fr. frise
- frigate, Middle Fr. frégate
- frigidity
- fringe, Old Fr. frenge *frippery
- frisk
- frisson
- fritter, Old Fr. friture
- frivol
- frivolity
- frivolous
- frizz
- frock
- fromage
- front
- frontier
- frontispiece
- frottage
- frown, Old Fr. froignier, compare Mod. Fr. renfrogner
- fructify
- frugal
- frugality
- fruit
- fry
- fuel
- fugitive
- fugue
- full (v.)
- fulminant
- fulmination
- fume
- fumigation
- function, Old Fr. function, compare Mod. Fr. fonction
- functionary
- fund
- funeral
- funereal
- funest
- funk, Old Fr. fungier
- funnel
- fur
- furbelow
- furbish
- furious
- furnace
- furnish
- furniture
- furor
- furrier
- furtive
- fury, Old Fr. furie
- fuselage
- fusible
- fusilier
- fusillade
- fusion
- fusty
- futile
- future (Old Fr. futur)

== G ==
- gabardine
- gabble
- gaffe
- gage
- gaiety
- gain
- gaiter
- gallant, compare galant
- gallantry
- galleon, Old Fr. galion
- gallery
- galley
- gallimaufry
- gallon
- gallop, Old Fr. galop
- galoshes
- galvanise or galvanize
- gambit
- gambol
- gambrel
- gamin
- gamine
- gammon
- ganache
- gangrene
- gangue
- gantry
- garage
- garb
- garbage
- garble
- garçon
- garden
- gardener
- garderobe
- gargantuan
- gargle
- gargoyle
- garland
- garment
- garner
- garnet
- garnish
- garret
- garrison
- garter, Old N. Fr. gartier, compare modern Fr. jarretière
- gasconade
- gash
- gasket
- gateau
- gauche
- gaucherie
- gaudy
- gauge
- gaunt
- gauntlet
- gauze
- gavage
- gavotte
- gay (Old Fr. gai)
- gazelle
- gazette
- gel
- gelatin or gelatine, Fr. gélatine
- gelatinous
- gem, Old Fr. gemme
- gendarme
- gender, from genre
- general
- generic
- generosity
- generous
- genial
- genie, Fr génie
- genre
- genteel
- gentility
- gentle, Old Fr. gentil
- gentry
- gerbil
- germ
- german
- germane
- gest
- gesticulation
- gesture, from geste (movement)
- giant
- gibbet
- gibbon
- giblets
- giclée
- gigolo
- gillyflower
- gimbal
- gimlet
- gin
- gingerbread
- giraffe
- gizzard
- glace
- glacial
- glaciation
- glacier
- glacis
- glaive
- glance
- glean
- glebe
- gleek
- gleet (Old Fr. glette)
- glissade
- global
- globe (Old Fr. globe)
- globular
- globule
- glorify
- glorious
- glory
- glucose
- glue
- glut, Old Fr. gloter
- glutin
- glutton
- gluttonous
- gluttony
- gob
- gobbet
- goblet, Old Fr. gobelet
- goblin
- goitre
- gondolier
- gorge
- gorgeous
- gouache
- gouge
- gourd
- gourmand
- gourmet
- gout
- govern
- governance
- governess
- government
- governor
- gown
- grace
- gracious
- grade
- grail
- grain
- gram
- grampus
- grand
- grandeur
- grandiose
- grand mal
- grange
- granite
- grant
- grantor
- grape
- grapnel
- grapple
- grate
- grater
- gratification
- gratin
- grave (adj.)
- gravel
- gravy
- grease
- greave
- grebe
- grenade
- grenadier
- grenadine
- griddle
- grief
- grievance
- grieve
- grievous
- griffin or griffon
- grill
- grille
- grimace
- grimoire
- griot
- grippe
- grisaille
- grizzle
- grizzled
- grognard
- grogram
- grommet
- gross
- grotesque
- group
- groyne
- grudge
- gruel, Old Fr. gruel, compare Mod. Fr. gruau
- guarantee
- guaranty
- guard, Middle Fr. garde
- guardian, Anglo-Fr. gardein, from Old Fr. gardien
- gudgeon
- guerdon
- guide
- guidon
- guile
- guillotine
- guise
- gules
- gulf, Old Fr. golfe
- gullet
- gum
- gusset
- gutter
- guttural
- guzzle
- gyrfalcon

== H ==
- haberdasher
- habiliment
- habit
- habitable
- habitant
- habitat
- habitation
- habitual, Old Fr. habitual, compare mod. Fr. habituel
- haggard
- halberd
- hale (v.)
- halt (n.)
- hamlet
- hamper (n.)
- hangar
- harangue
- harass
- harassment
- harbinger
- hardy
- harlequin, Middle Fr. Harlequin, from Old Fr. Herlequin or Hellequin
- harlot, Old Fr. herlot or arlot
- harness
- harridan
- hash
- haste, Old Fr. haste, compare modern Fr. hâte
- hasty
- hatch (v.)
- hatchet
- hauberk
- haught
- haunch
- haunt
- hautboy
- haute couture
- haute cuisine
- hauteur
- haversack
- havoc
- hawser
- hazard, Old Fr. hasard
- hazardous
- hearse
- hectare
- heinous
- heir
- heiress
- hellebore
- helmet
- herald
- heraldic
- heraldry
- herb, Old Fr. erbe, compare modern Fr. herbe
- herbage
- herbal
- herbivore
- heredity
- heritability
- heritable, Fr. héritable
- heritage, Old Fr. eritage, compare modern Fr. héritage
- hermit
- hermitage
- heron
- hideous, Anglo-Fr. hidous, from Old Fr. hideus, compare modern Fr. hideux
- historian
- historic
- history, Old Fr. historie, compare mod. Fr. histoire
- hod
- hodgepodge, Old Fr. hochepot
- hoe
- hollandaise
- homage
- homicide
- honest
- honesty
- honour or honor, Anglo-Fr. honour, from Old Fr. onor or eneur, compare modern Fr. honneur
- honourable or honorable, Old Fr. honorable, compare modern Fr. honorable
- honorary
- hoopla, Fr. houp là
- horde
- horrible
- horror
- hors de combat
- hospice
- hospitable
- hospital, Old Fr. hospital, compare modern Fr. hôpital
- hospitality, Old Fr. hospitalité
- host, Old Fr. hoste, compare modern Fr. hôte
- hostage
- hostel, Old Fr. hostel, compare modern Fr. hôtel
- hostelry
- hostile
- hostility
- hostler
- hotel, Old Fr. hostel, compare modern Fr. hôtel
- hotelier
- hour, Anglo-Fr. houre, compare modern Fr. heure
- hue, Old Fr. hue
- huge, Old Fr. ahuge
- human
- humane
- humanity, Old Fr. humanité
- humble
- humid
- humidity
- humiliation, Old Fr. humiliation
- humility
- humorous
- humour or humor
- hurt, Old Fr. hurter, compare modern Fr. heurter
- hut, Fr. hutte, from Germ. hütte
- hutch, Old Fr. huche

== I ==
- iamb
- ibogaine
- idée fixe
- identifiable
- identification
- identify
- identity
- ides
- idolater
- idolatry
- ignition
- ignoble
- ignominious
- ignominy
- ignorance
- ignorant
- ignore
- iliac
- illegal
- illegality
- illiberal
- illicit
- illumination
- illumine
- illusion
- illusory
- illustration
- image
- imagery
- imaginary
- imagination
- imaginative
- imagine
- imbecile
- imbibe
- imbrication
- imbrue
- imbue
- imitable
- imitation
- immanence
- immanent
- immature
- immediate
- immemorial
- immense
- immensity
- immobile
- immobilisation
- immobilise
- immobility
- immolation
- immoral
- immorality
- immortal
- immortality
- immunisation
- immunise
- immunity
- immunology
- immutability
- immutable
- impair
- impalpable
- impart
- impartial
- impartiality
- impasse
- impassible
- impatience
- impatient
- impeach
- impeachment
- impeccable
- impenetrable
- imperceptible
- imperfect
- imperfection
- imperial
- imperious
- imperishable
- impermanence
- impermanent
- impermeability
- impermeable
- impermissible
- impertinence
- impertinent
- imperturbable
- impetuosity
- impetuous
- impi
- impiety
- impious
- implacable
- implant
- implantation
- implication
- implicit
- imply
- importance
- important
- importation
- importune
- importunity
- imposable
- impose
- imposition
- impossibility
- impossible
- imposter
- impostor
- imposture
- impotence
- impotent
- impoverish
- impoverishment
- imprecision
- impregnable
- impregnation
- impression
- impressionable
- imprint
- imprison
- imprisonment
- improbable
- impromptu
- improper
- impropriety
- improve
- improvement
- improvisation
- improvise
- imprudence
- imprudent
- impudence
- impudent
- impugn
- impugnable
- impulse
- impulsion
- impulsive
- impunity
- impure
- impurity
- imputation
- impute
- inability
- inaccessibility
- inaccessible
- inaction
- inactive
- inactivity
- inadmissible
- inadvertence
- inadvisable
- inalienable
- inane
- inanition
- inanity
- inapplicability
- inapplicable
- inapt
- inattention
- inattentive
- inaudibility
- inaudible
- inaugural
- inauguration
- inauthenticity
- incalculable
- incandescence
- incandescent
- incantation
- incantatory
- incapability
- incapable
- incapacity
- incarceration
- incarnadine
- incarnation
- incendiary
- incense
- inceptive
- incertitude
- incessant
- incidence
- incident
- incise
- incision
- incisive
- incite
- incitement
- incivility
- inclination
- incline
- inclusion
- inclusive
- incoherence
- incoherent
- incommensurable
- incommode
- incommunicable
- incomparable
- incompatibility
- incompatible
- incompetence
- incompetent
- incomplete
- incomprehensible
- incomprehension
- incompressible
- inconceivable
- inconclusive
- incongruity
- incongruous
- inconsequent
- inconsiderable
- inconsolable
- inconstant
- incontestable
- incontinence
- incontinent
- inconvenience
- inconvenient
- incorporable
- incorporation
- incorrect
- incorrigible
- incorrigibly
- incorruptible
- increase
- incredulity
- incur
- incurable
- incursion
- indebted
- indecision
- indecisive
- indeclinable
- indefatigable
- indefeasible
- indemnity
- indent
- indentures
- independence
- independent
- indeterminable
- indexation
- indication
- indicative
- indice
- indict
- indictment
- indifference
- indifferent
- indigence
- indigene
- indigestion
- indignation
- indignity
- indirect
- indiscipline
- indiscretion
- indispensable
- indispose
- indisposition
- indisputable
- indissoluble
- indistinct
- indistinguishable
- indite
- indivisibility
- indivisible
- indolence
- indolent
- induction
- indulgence
- induration
- industrial
- industrialisation
- industrialise
- industrious
- industry
- ineffable
- ineffective
- inelegance
- inelegant
- ineligibility
- ineligible
- ineluctable
- inept
- inequality
- inequitable
- inequity
- inert
- inescapable
- inestimable
- inevitability
- inevitable
- inexact
- inexactitude
- inexcusable
- inexorability
- inexorable
- inexpedient
- inexperience
- inexplicable
- inextricable
- infamous
- infamy
- infantry, Fr. infanterie
- infatigable
- infeasible
- infect
- infection
- infectious
- infernal
- infertile
- infertility
- infest
- infestation
- infidel
- infidelity
- infinitive
- infinity
- inflammable
- inflammation
- inflation
- inflexibility
- inflexible
- inflexion
- influence
- inform
- information (Old Fr. information)
- infraction
- infrastructure
- infusion
- ingenious
- ingénue
- ingratitude
- ingredient
- inhabit
- inhabitable
- inhabitant
- inherit
- inheritable
- inheritance
- inhibition
- inhospitable
- inhuman
- inhumane
- inhumanity
- inimitable
- iniquity
- initial
- initiation
- initiative
- inject
- injure
- injurious
- injury
- injustice, Old Fr. injustice
- ink, Old Fr. enque, compare mod. Fr. encre
- innocence
- innocent
- innovation, Old Fr. innovacion, compare mod. Fr. innovation
- inoffensive
- inquest
- inquire
- inquiry
- inquisition
- inquisitive
- inquisitor
- insatiable
- inscription
- insect
- insecticide
- insectivore
- insemination
- insense
- insensibility
- insensible
- inseparable
- insidious
- insinuation
- insipid
- insist
- insistence
- insolence
- insolent
- insoluble
- insouciance
- insouciant
- inspect
- inspection
- inspiration
- inspire
- instability
- install
- installation
- instalment
- instance
- instant
- instigation
- instillation
- instinct
- institute
- institution
- institutional
- institutionalisation
- institutionalise
- instruction
- instrument
- insubordination
- insufficient
- insult
- insupportable
- insurance, from assurance
- insurgent, from insurgé
- insurmountable, from insurmontable
- insurrection
- intact
- intangible
- integrable
- integral
- integrant
- integration
- integrity
- intellectual
- intelligence
- intelligent
- intelligible
- intemperance
- intend
- intendant
- intense
- intensive
- intent
- intention
- intentive
- inter
- intercede
- intercept
- interception
- intercession
- interchange
- intercourse
- interdict
- interest
- interfere
- interjection
- interlace
- interlard
- intermarriage
- intermediary
- interminable
- intermittent
- intern
- interpellation
- interpolation
- interpose
- interposition
- interpret
- interpretation
- interrogation
- interruption
- intersection
- interstice
- interval
- intervention
- interview
- intimation
- intimidation
- intolerable
- intolerance
- intolerant
- intonation
- intone
- intransigence
- intransigent
- intrepid
- intrigue
- intrinsic, Old Fr. intrinsèque
- introduction
- introit
- intrusion
- intuition
- inundation, Old Fr. inundacion, compare mod. Fr. inondation
- inure
- inutile
- invalid
- invasion
- invasive
- invective
- inveigle
- invent
- invention
- inventive
- inventory
- invert
- invest
- investigation
- investiture
- invincibility
- invincible
- inviolability
- inviolable
- invisibility
- invisible
- invitation
- invite
- invocation
- invoice
- invokable
- invoke
- invulnerability
- invulnerable
- irascible
- ire
- irradiation
- irreconcilable
- irregular
- irregularity
- irreparable
- irreproachable
- irresolution
- irreverence, Old Fr. irreverence
- irrevocable
- irrigation
- irritability
- irritable
- irritant
- irritation
- irruption
- isle
- islet
- isolation
- issue
- ivory, Anglo-Fr. ivorie, from Old N. Fr. ivurie, compare modern Fr. ivoire

== See also ==
- French phrases used by English speakers
- Law French
- Glossary of fencing, (predominantly from French).
- Glossary of ballet (predominantly from French)
- Lists of English loanwords by country or language of origin
- List of English words of Gaulish origin
- List of English words of Latin origin
- List of English Latinates of Germanic origin
- List of English words of Frankish origin
- Latin influence in English
- List of French words of Germanic origin
- List of French words of Gaulish origin
- List of French words of Arabic origin
