= Woven coverlet =

Type of bed covering

A woven coverlet or coverlid (derived from Cat. cobrellit) is a type of bed covering with a woven design in colored wool yarn on a background of natural linen or cotton. Coverlets were woven in almost every community in the United States from the colonial era until the late 19th century.

== History ==
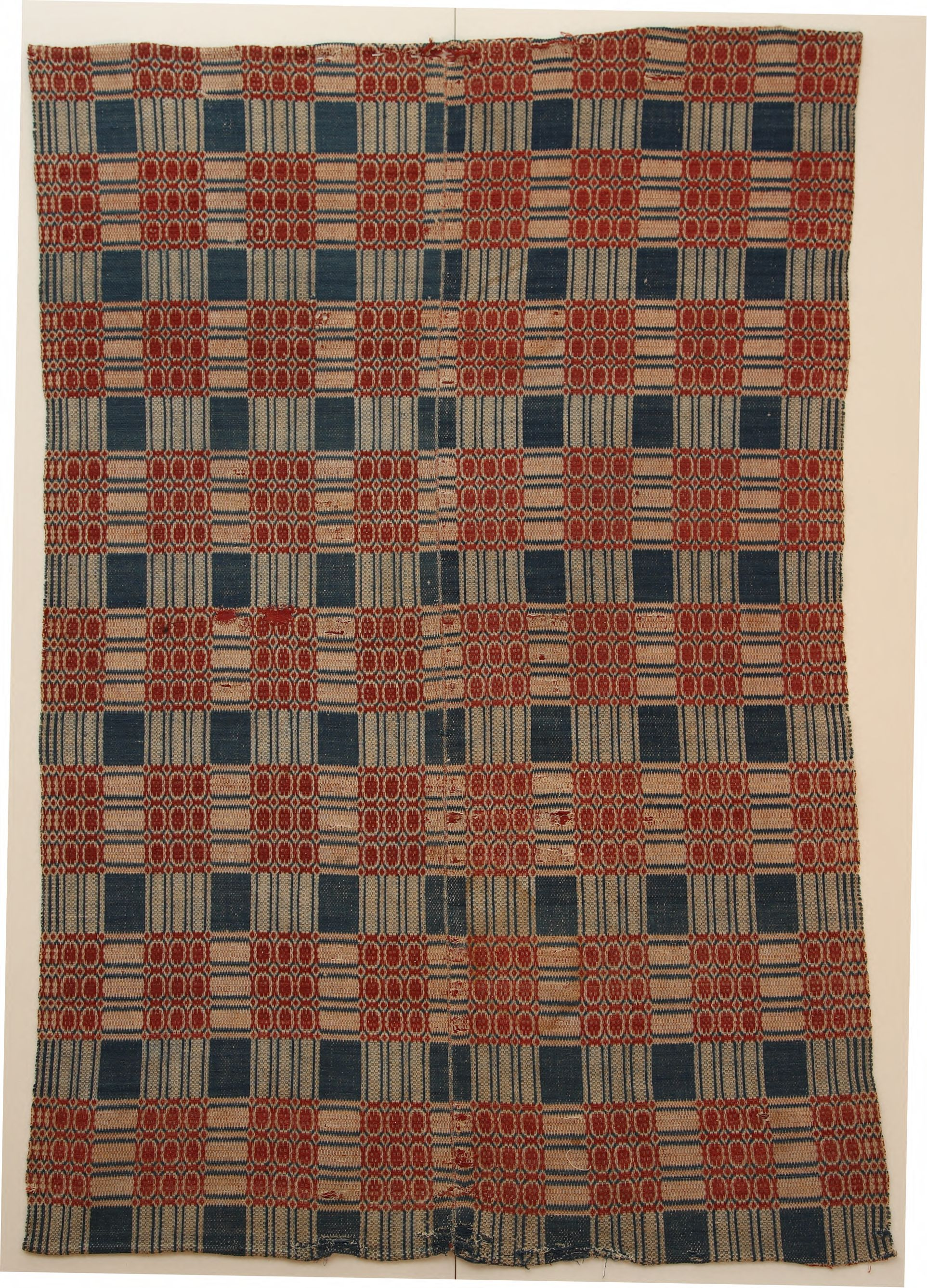
Overshot coverlet once owned by William and Elizabeth Conner, 19th century

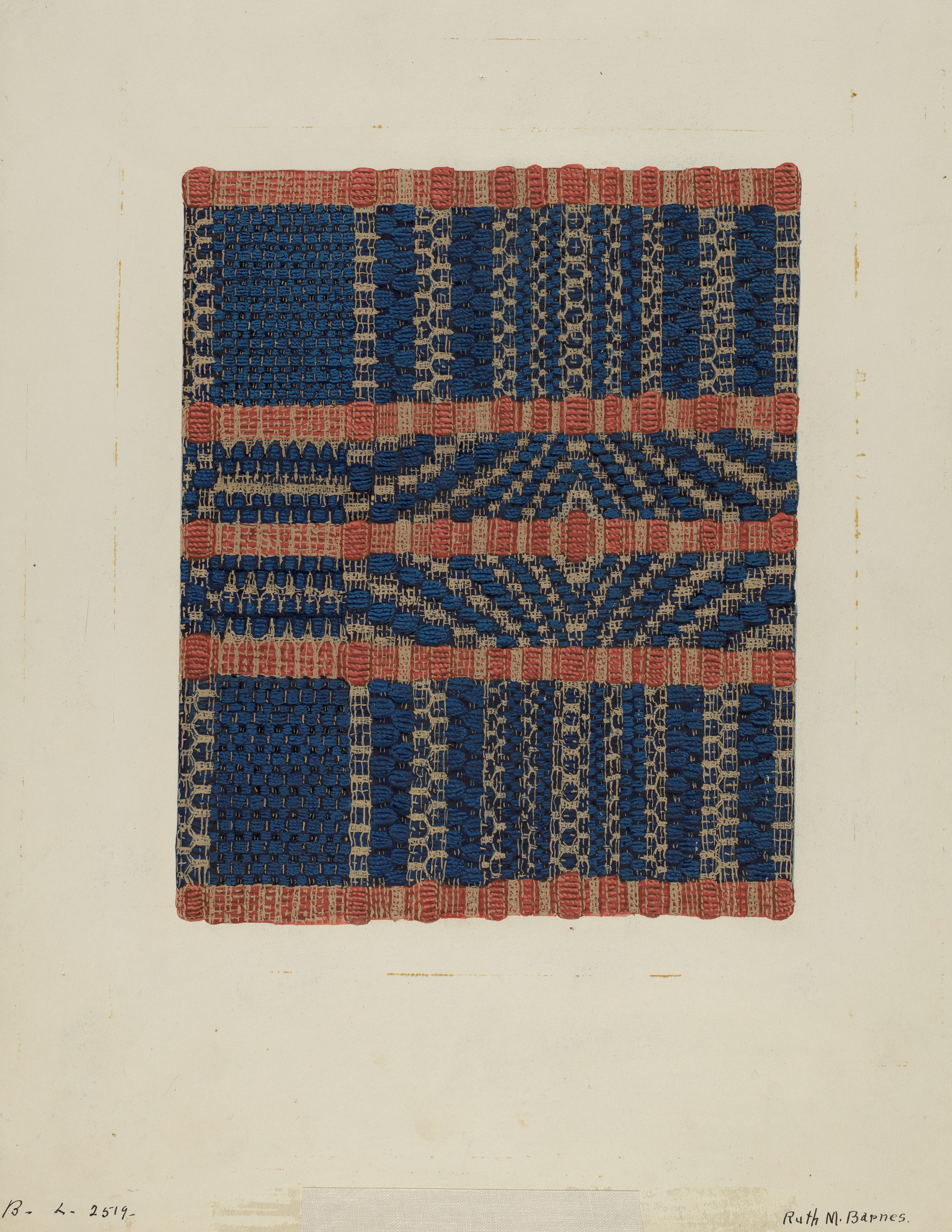
Drawing of a detail of a woven coverlet from the Index of American Design at the National Gallery of Art in Washington, D.C.

Coverlets of 18th century America were twill-woven with a linen warp and woolen weft. The wool was most often dyed a dark blue from indigo, but madder red, walnut brown, and a lighter "Williamsburg blue" were also used.

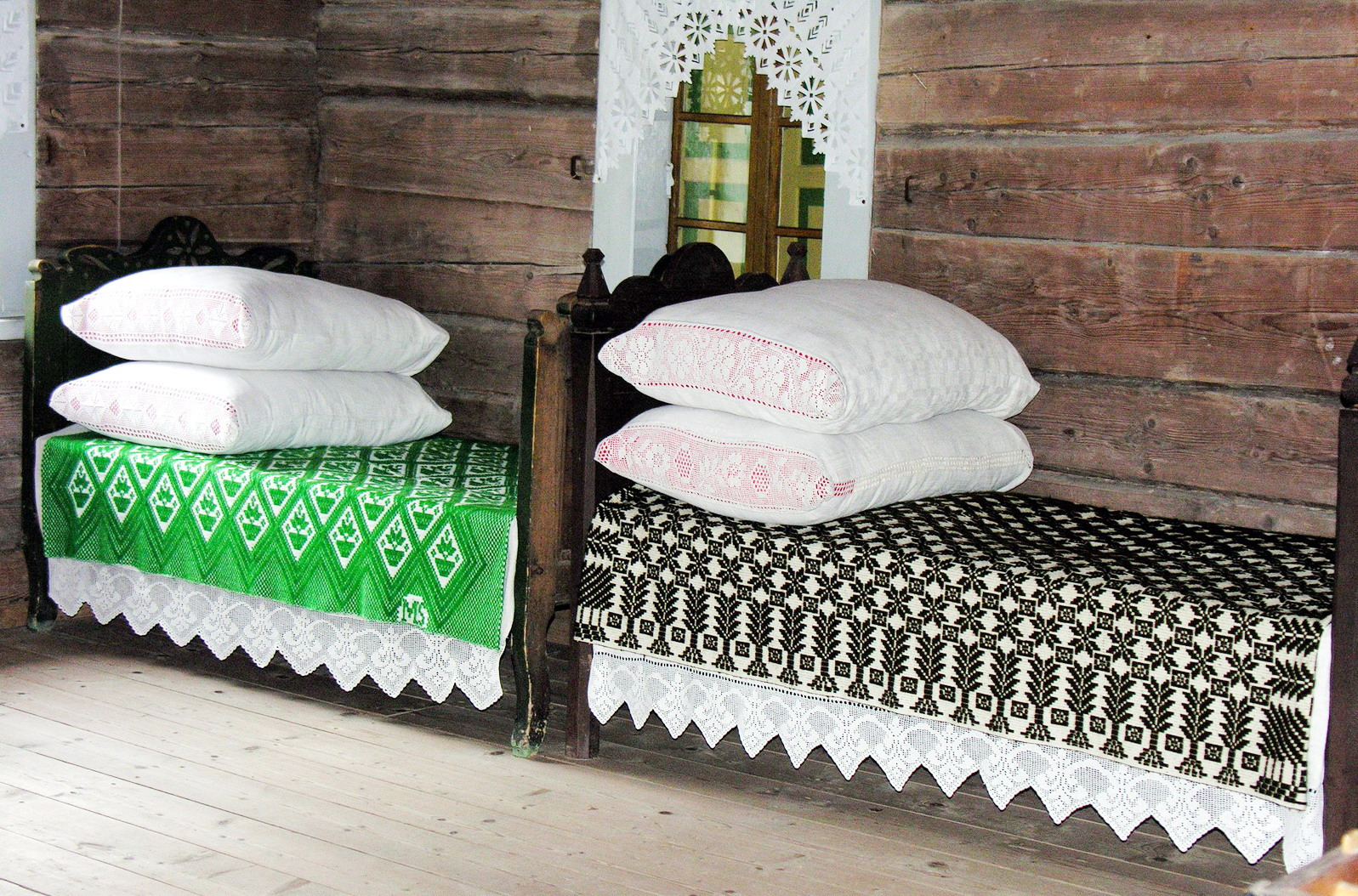
Two beds topped by colored coverlets

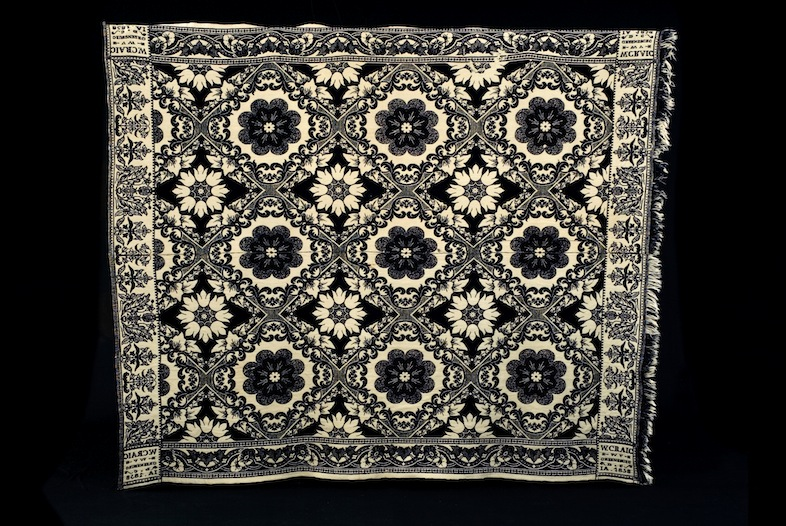
Jacquard coverlet, 1858, Children's Museum of Indianapolis.

From the turn of the 19th century, simple twill-woven coverlets gave way to patterned hand-woven coverlets made in two different ways:

- Overshot weave coverlets were made with a plain woven undyed cotton warp and weft and repeating geometric patterns made with a supplementary dyed woolen weft. Made on a simple four-harness loom, overshot coverlets were often made in the home and remained a common craft in rural Appalachia into the early 20th century.

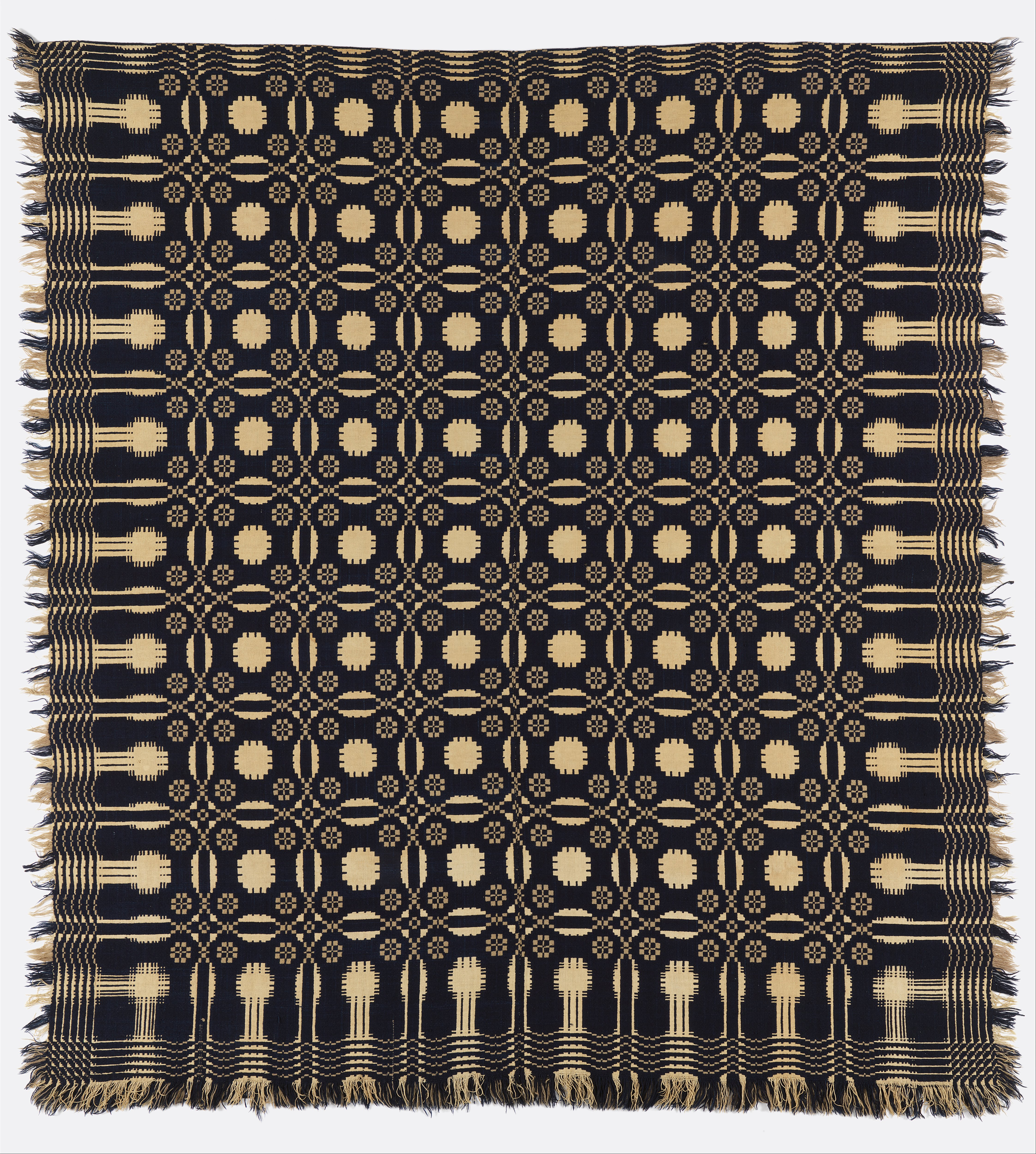
Wool and cotton double cloth coverlet, early 19th century, in the Cooper Hewitt.

- Double-cloth coverlets were double-woven, with two sets of interconnected warps and wefts, requiring the more elaborate looms of professional weavers. Wool for these coverlets was spun (and often dyed) at home and then delivered to a local weaver who made up the coverlet.

Summer-winter coverlets were reversible, and the summer-winter term refers to the structure not the color. The summer-winter coverlet should not be confused with double weave and is more closely related to overshot. Like double weave, it is dark on one side and light on the other but there is only one layer of cloth, therefore it is much lighter in mass and thickness.

Following the introduction of the jacquard loom in the early 1820s, machine-woven coverlets in large-scale floral designs became popular.

== See also ==
- Linsey-woolsey

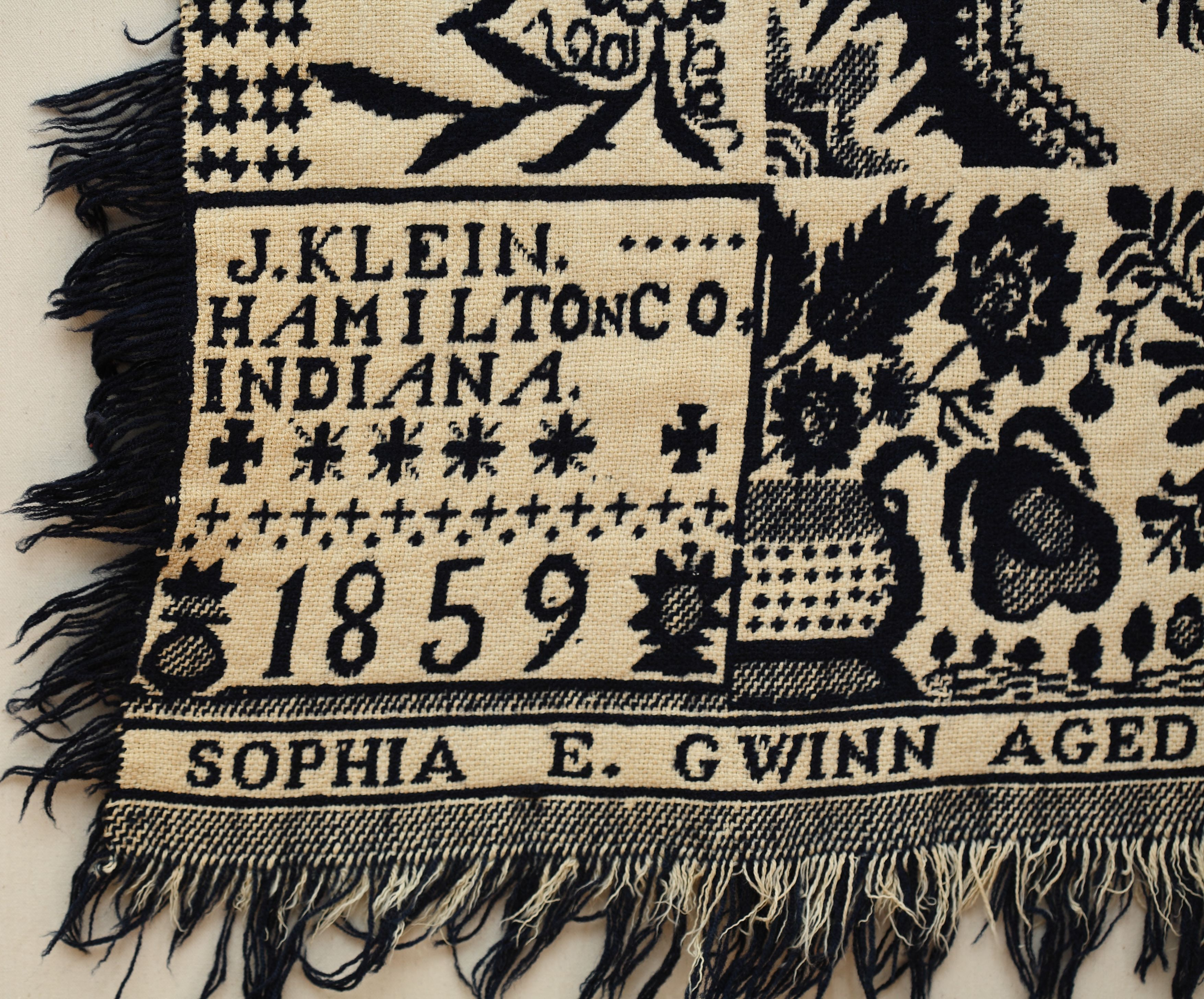
Double jacquard coverlet with self fringe, woven by John Klein in 1859
