= Duvet cover =

Cover for duvet

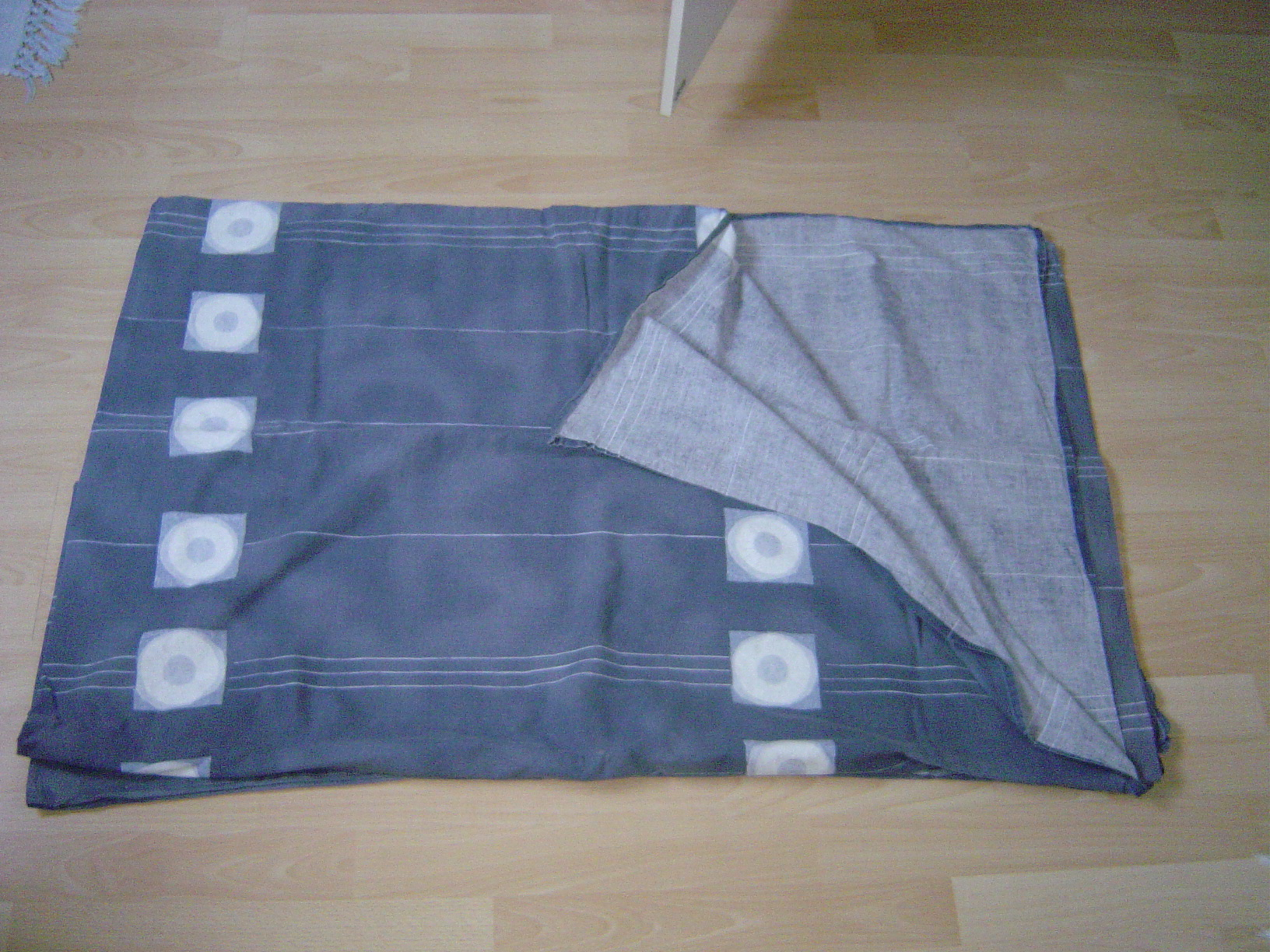
A folded duvet cover

A duvet cover is a cover for a duvet. The duvet cover decorates and protects the duvet during use.

== Function ==
Duvet covers frequently have a decorative function on the bed, allowing for change of pattern or design for different occasions, or to serve different functions; for example, a heavier duvet cover may be used during colder seasons.

Duvet covers protect the underlying duvet. Frequently it is easier to wash the duvet cover than the duvet itself.

== Material ==
Mass-produced duvet covers are usually made of cotton or a blend of cotton and polyester and can be easily removed to wash at home, while a duvet can be expensive and difficult to clean. Duvet covers may be made from two sheets or panels of cloth sewn together.

=== Design ===
A duvet cover may or may not have a fastening, known as a closure. Examples of closures include buttons, plastic clasps, zips, and ties. If the duvet cover does not have a closure it can be known as flat, flap or envelope.

In the Nordic countries, some duvet covers have openings for the hands in the corners, making it easier to change the duvet cover.
