= Dutch wife =

Dutch wife may refer to:

- a type of body pillow
- a contour leg pillow
- a long body-length pillow known as dakimakura
- a sex doll
- a long hard bolster, made of materials like rattan, wicker or bamboo, known as a bamboo wife
- a hot water bottle
- a sewing kit
