= Nantong blue calico =

Nantong blue calico printing and dyeing has been practiced in most parts of Nantong City, Jiangsu Province, China, since the beginning of Qing dynasty. In modern times, blue calico is used to make daily clothes, mosquito nets, pillowcases, or baggage cloth.

The blue and white printed calico was first worn by local farmers and fishermen. Among Nantong citizens, it is known for its handmade printing and dying process, as well as the native and simple design. The patterns on the blue clothes originate from animals, plants, and fairy tales, and are used to express the good wishes for the future.

== Printing and Dyeing Skill ==
The design typically features a blue background with white flowers or a white background with blue flowers. The folk techniques maintained the traditional process for hundreds of years. A series of complicated processes is needed to produce blue calico, including selecting cotton material, soaking in water, gluing the template, dyeing, cleaning, and sunning. The pattern to be dyed must be cut into a paper template, which is then covered in tung oil, dried, and glued to the fabric.

== Historical Evolution ==
During Song (song 宋) Dynasties, blue calico was called Yaoban Cloth(yào bān bù 药斑布), and during Ming (míng 明) and Qing (qīng 清) Dynasties, it was called Jiaohua Cloth (jiāo huā bù 浇花布). The patterns on blue calico are all from civil society, and they reflect the experiences of the common people. With the development of the textile technology during Qing Dynasty, there were large quantities of dyeing and weaving workshops.

== Legend ==
Due to the long history of traditional manual printing and dyeing, a legend surrounds Nantong blue calico. The legend said Mei fell in the mud, accidentally coloring his clothes yellow. The yellow color was difficult to wash out, but many residents found it attractive. He told his good friend Ge this accident. They specialized in this yellow-stained cloth, but realized that the color faded quickly. However, when they hung the cloth out to dry on a tree, it was blown to a clump of indigo grass, which dyed the cloth blue. Mei and Ge learned how to use the grass to dye fabric blue.

== Museum ==
In order to preserve and develop this art, Nantong Blue Calico Art Gallery was set up in 1996 near Haohe River (濠河) by Wu Yuanxin (吴元新). One thousand antique blue calicoes and drawings were collected here. In addition, the traditional hand-making process is shown in the art gallery.
