= Water pillow =

Type of pillow containing water

A water pillow is a type of pillow that incorporates a sealed water chamber used to adjust firmness and support. By adding or removing water, users can modify the level of support provided by the pillow.

In some clinical studies and media reports, similar designs have been described as water-based pillows. Research in sleep ergonomics indicates that pillow height and structural support may influence head and neck posture during sleep.

== Design ==
Water pillows generally consist of a water reservoir enclosed within a conventional pillow structure. The amount of water inside the pillow can be adjusted to change firmness and support.

Unlike conventional pillows that rely entirely on fixed fill materials, water pillows allow the level of support to be modified by adjusting the water volume within the internal chamber.

== Research ==
Research in sleep ergonomics and biomechanics has examined how pillow characteristics, including height and support, affect cervical spine alignment during sleep. Studies suggest that pillow height and support properties may influence muscle activity, pressure distribution, and perceived comfort.

== See also ==
- Pillow
- Orthopedic pillow
- Sleep
- Ergonomics
