= Pillow =

Cushion for the head

Pillows on a bed.

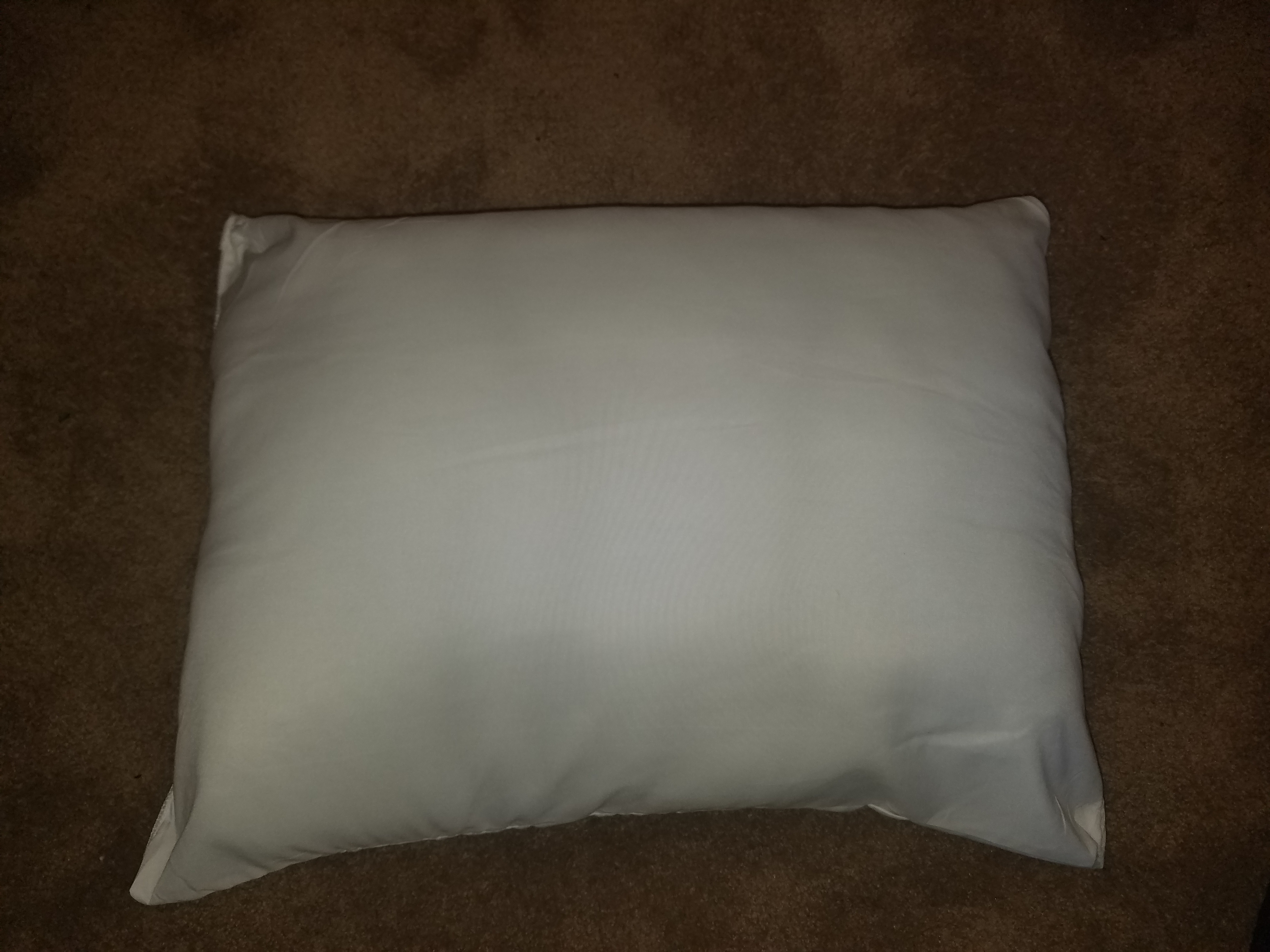
A typical pillow.

A pillow is a soft fabric cushion used to support the head or body. Pillows are a form of bedding that supports the head and neck. Some pillows are purely decorative.

In contemporary western culture, pillows are encased in a plain or patterned fabric envelope (known as a pillowcase). Inside is a soft stuffing from synthetic or natural materials.

The word pillow comes from Middle English pilwe, from Old English pyle (akin to Old High German pfuliwi) and from Latin pulvinus. The first known use of the word pillow was before the 12th century.

== History ==
Use of pillows evolved in animals well into prehistory; reptiles and mammals use bodies as pillows, either rest their heads on themselves, and one another, to support the head and neck. Use of pillows for comfort is evident in arboreal mammals, particularly members of Panthera and Hominoidea with several species observed selecting specific parts of tree branches for this purpose. Natural resting postures, such as the use of a laterally rotated arm or leg, may be superior to artificially created pillows in the reduction of stiffness and pain in the joints, and allows an animal to stay more alert to danger by keeping both ears open.

Pillow or cushion making is not exclusive to humans. Nest-building primates sometimes create pillow-like structures. Tree-dwelling orangutans typically use twigs to create them, while chimpanzees have been observed making them on the ground from leaves. It has been observed in other ground-dwelling mammals as well; for example, Asian elephants in captivity have been observed creating pillows from straw, though the behaviour has not been observed in the wild. Since domestication, many animals have also learned to make use of human-made pillows and cushions.

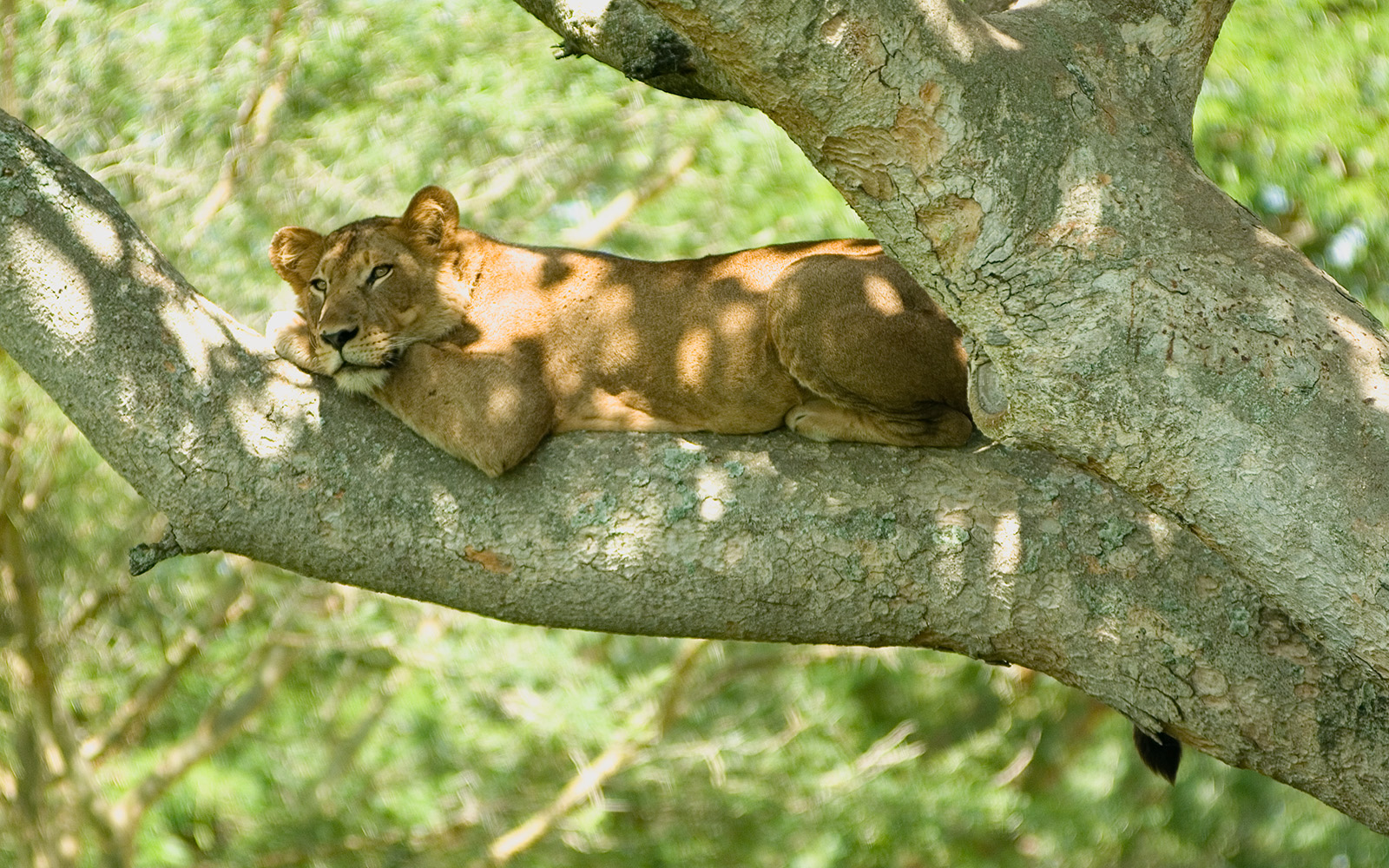
A lion resting in a tree using a leg as a pillow

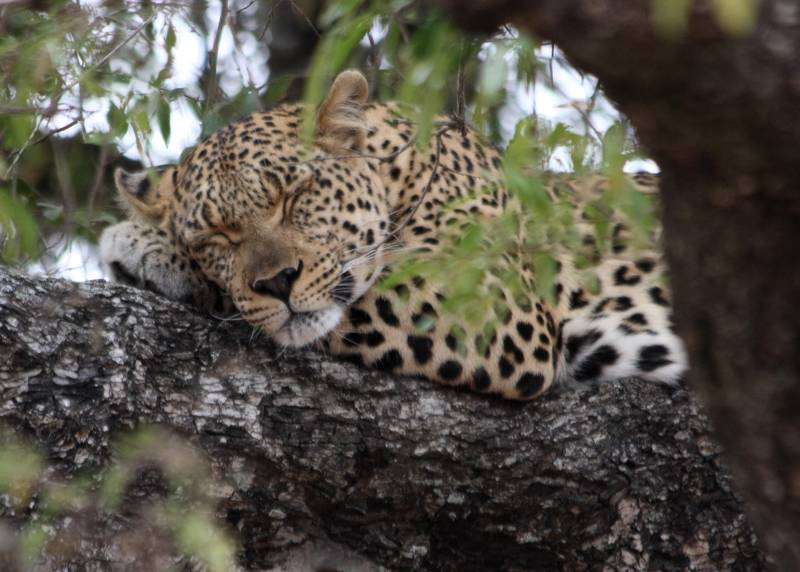
A leopard resting in a tree using a leg as a pillow

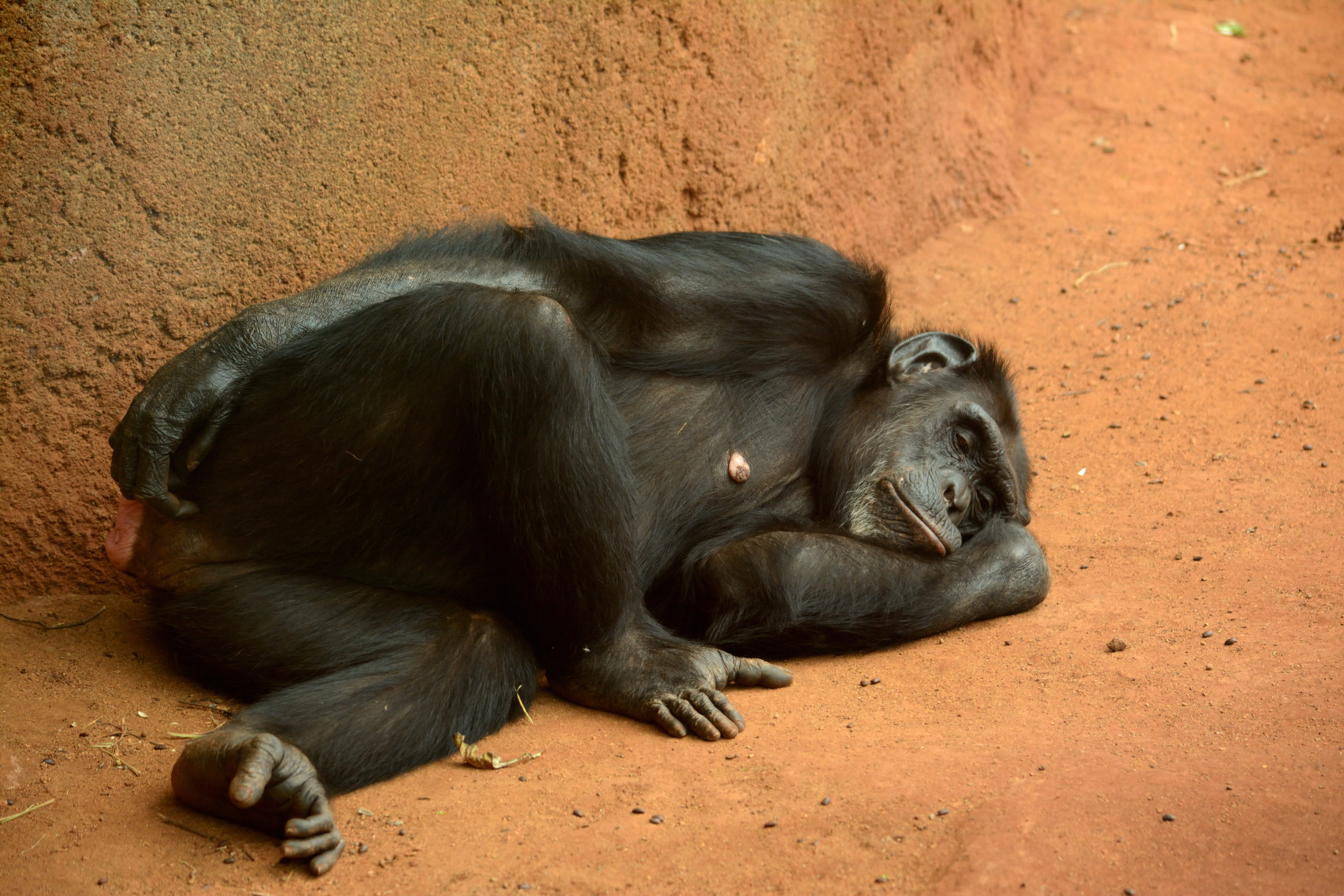
Chimpanzee using an arm as a pillow

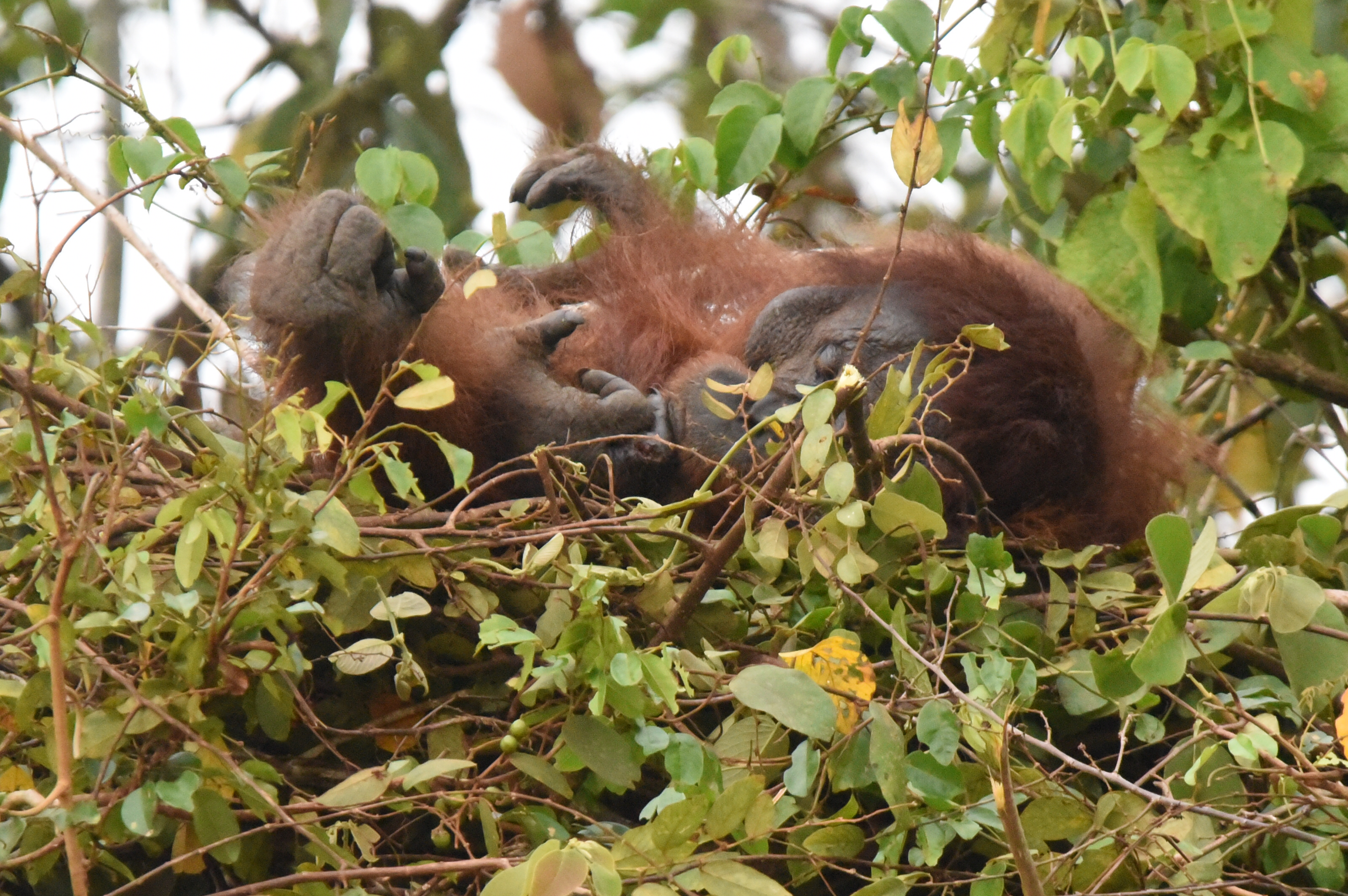
Orangutan laying on a pillow made of twigs

Sometime between 5 and 23 million years ago tree-dwelling great apes began building sleeping platforms, including wooden pillows, to improve their sleep. According to studies on chimpanzees that sleep up to eight to nine hours a night using specifically selected ironwood pillows, sturdy pillows enabled great apes to escape being hunted by night predators and not fall out of the trees while asleep. It is likely that this was necessitated by the evolution of large, energy-consuming brains. Though it may also have led to longer periods of REM sleep, that in turn increased their cognitive capacity.

Humans began making beds 227,000 years ago in Africa made from ash and grass. Recent evidence from 185,000 years ago at Misliya Cave shows that Neanderthals did similar. Prior to this discovery, the earliest were believed to be 77,000 years old. Much later humans began switching to use of separate stone and wood to craft pillows for increased comfort.

=== Mesopotamia and ancient Egypt ===
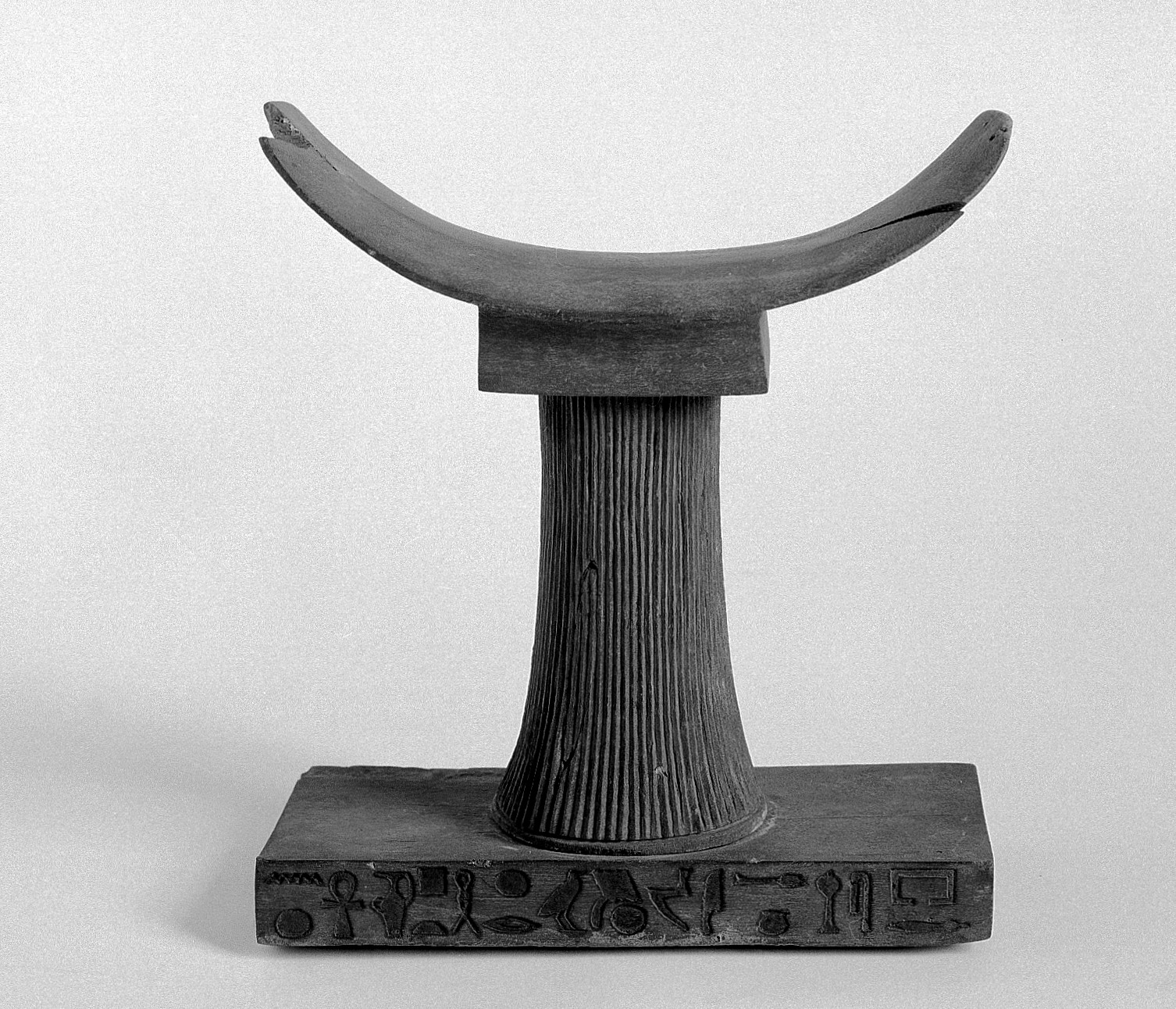
An ancient Egyptian wooden pillow.

The earliest recorded use of the modern human device dates back to the civilizations of Mesopotamia around 7,000 BC. During this time, only the wealthy used pillows. The number of pillows symbolized status so the more pillows one owned the more affluence they held. Pillows have long been produced around the world in order to help solve the reoccurring problem of neck, back, and shoulder pain while sleeping. Besides for comfort, the pillow was also used for keeping bugs and insects out of people's hair, mouth, nose, and ears while sleeping.

Pillow use has been associated with the mummies and tombs of ancient Egypt during the 11th dynasty, dating to 2055–1985 B.C. Ancient Egyptian pillows were wooden or stone headrests. These pillows were mostly used by placing them under the heads of the deceased because the head of a human was considered to be the essence of life and sacred.

=== Ancient Europe ===
The Romans and Greeks of ancient Europe mastered the creation of the softer type pillow. These pillows were stuffed with reeds, feathers, and straw in order to make them softer and more comfortable. Only upper-class people typically owned these softer pillows; however, all classes of people were allowed to use some type of pillow while sleeping, lying down or sitting in order to give them support. People in ancient Europe started to use pillows when going to church in order to kneel on while praying and to place holy books on. This is a tradition that still lives on today. In addition, the Romans and Greeks used their pillows by placing them under the head of those deceased just like the ancient Egyptians did.

=== Ancient China ===
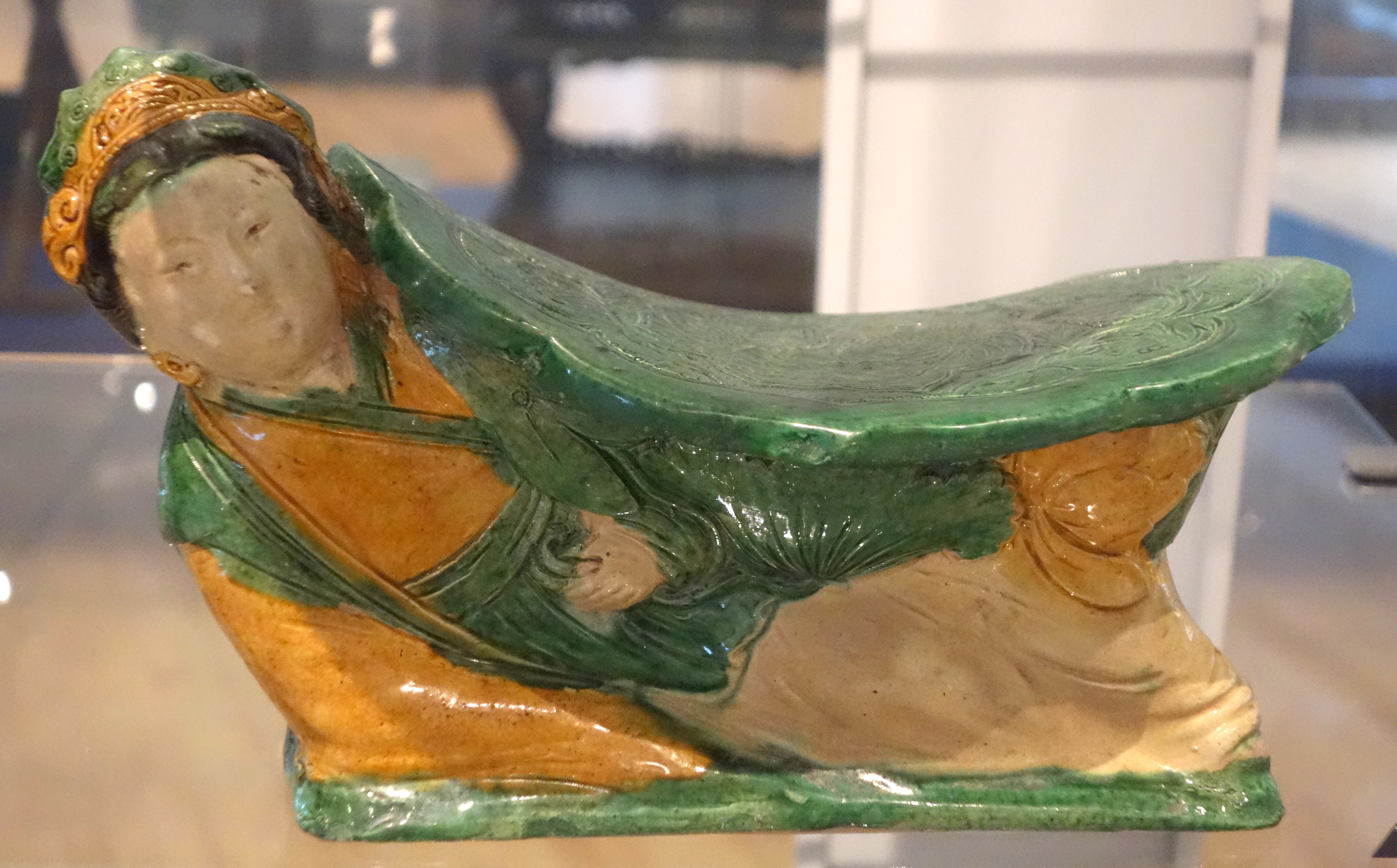
A pottery pillow from the Jīn dynasty (1115–1234).

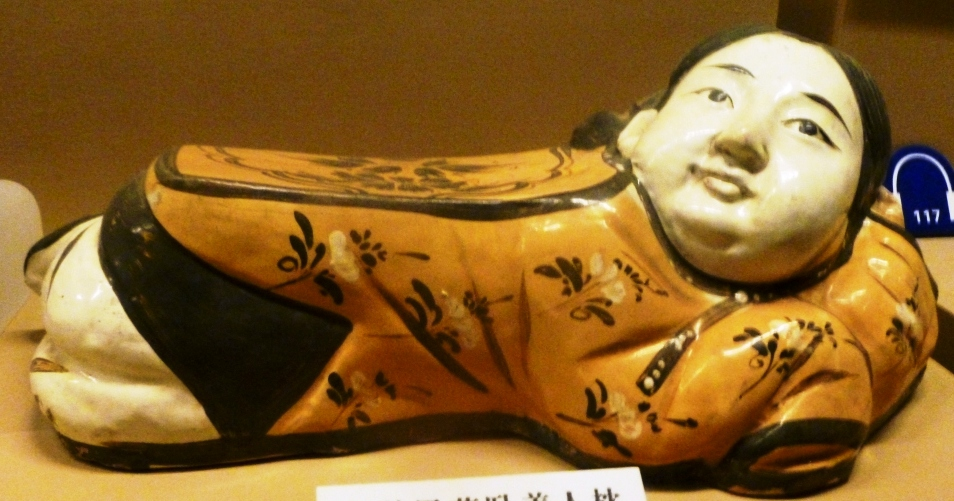
Porcelain pillow, Huangling county, Jin dynasty (1115–1234), China.

Chinese pillows were traditionally solid, though sometimes used with a softer fabric over them. Over many Chinese dynasties, pillows were made from a wide range of materials including bamboo, jade, porcelain, wood, and bronze. Ceramic pillows became the most popular. The use of the ceramic pillow first appeared in the Sui dynasty between 581 and 618 while mass production appeared in the Tang dynasty between 618 and 907. The Chinese decorated their pillows by making them different shapes and by painting pictures of animals, humans, and plants on them. One common type of pottery used was Cizhou ware. Chinese ceramic pillows reached their peak in terms of production and use during the Song, Jin, and Yuan dynasties between the 10th and 14th century, but slowly phased out during the Ming and Qing dynasties between 1368 and 1911 with the emergence of better pillow making materials.

== Construction and parts ==
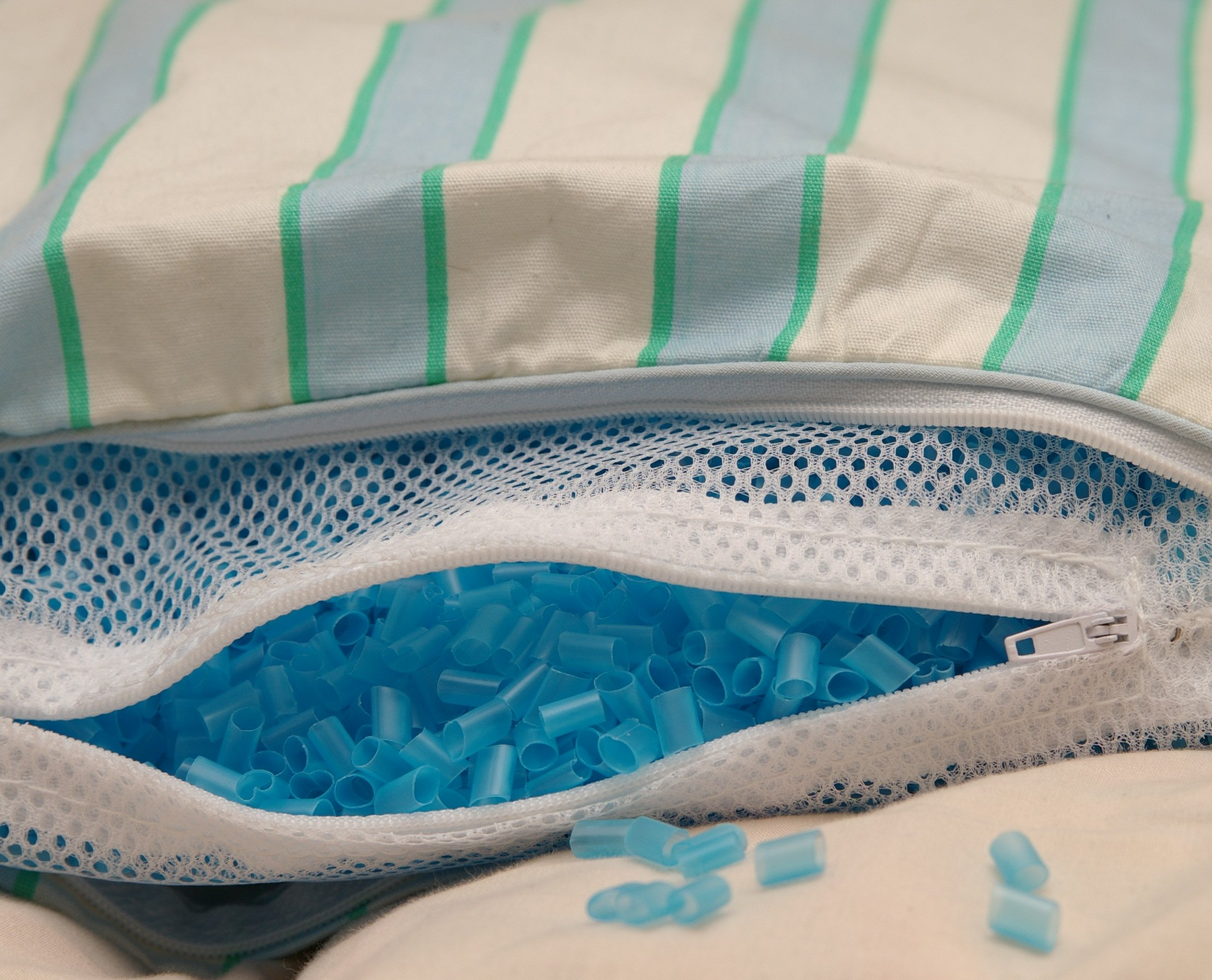
A Japanese pillow filled with plastic tubes in a mesh sack.

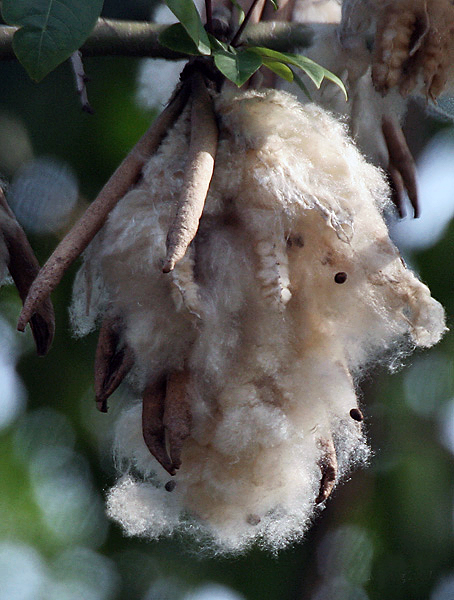
The fruit-fibres of the silk-cotton tree (Ceiba pentandra) are used as filler for traditional pillows in India.

Pillows consist of a filler material enclosed in a fabric cover or shell. Covers are made of cloth, such as silk, known as the pillow case or pillow slip. Some pillows have a fancier cover called a sham which is closed on all sides and usually has a slit in the back through which the pillow is placed. Rectangular standard bed pillow cases usually do not have zippers, but instead, have one side open all the time. Often, a zippered pillow protector is placed around standard pillows with the case in turn covering the protector.

Fillers are chosen on the basis of comfort, resilience, thermal properties, cost and also for medical and ethical reasons. The most common synthetic fillers are materials derived from polymer fibers, such as polyester and memory foam. Synthetic fillers in general are inexpensive and in the case of memory foam can retain their form longer. Natural fillers have been used since antiquity. The most common are feathers, down, wool, latex, cotton (particularly in India), and buckwheat. More exotic materials have also been used including straw, wood, or stone. Down is usually the softer filler and offers good insulation, but is more expensive due to its relative scarcity. Down has been known to be plucked from live geese, but there are already cruelty-free certifications for down products. In India, traditional pillows are made with kapok, the fluffy, glossy fruit-fibres of the trees Ceiba pentandra and Bombax ceiba.

== Lifespan, maintenance and waste management ==
The normal lifespan of a typical western pillow is two to four years. Condition of the pillow can be determined by checking for lumps or folding it in order to see if it stays in that shape. Replacement is recommended for sanitary reasons. All types of pillow covers should be laundered periodically since they are the part that is in contact with a person's body. Pillows accumulate dust and microbes among the fill, even when washable pillows are washed. Manufacturers recommend tumble-drying for fifteen minutes every week to freshen them up, and for the heat to kill dust mites. Charities in most countries will not accept used pillows due to hygiene regulations. While some animal shelters accept forms of bedding, most reject donation of used pillows due to the mess they can cause.

Recycling of pillows, like most textile and bedding items, is expensive and has poor yield. As such, few are recycled and most end up in landfills. Their light weight means that they make up a low proportion of household waste by mass. Most of the few pillows collected for recycling are sent to India and Pakistan and used as low-cost bedding, or in South East Asia, co-mingled with other textiles to manufacture cheap bedding.

== Types ==
A pillow is designed to provide support and comfort to the body and head. There are three main types of pillows; bed pillows, orthopedic pillows and decorative pillows, with some overlapping of use between these. The appropriate size of a bed pillow depends on the size of the bed. Larger pillows than standard are available for queen- and king-sized beds.

The choice of bed pillow depends to some extent upon sleeping positions: one manufacturer recommends a thinner and softer pillow for sleeping face down, medium support for sleeping on one's back, and a thicker and firmer pillow for sleeping on the side.

=== Beds ===
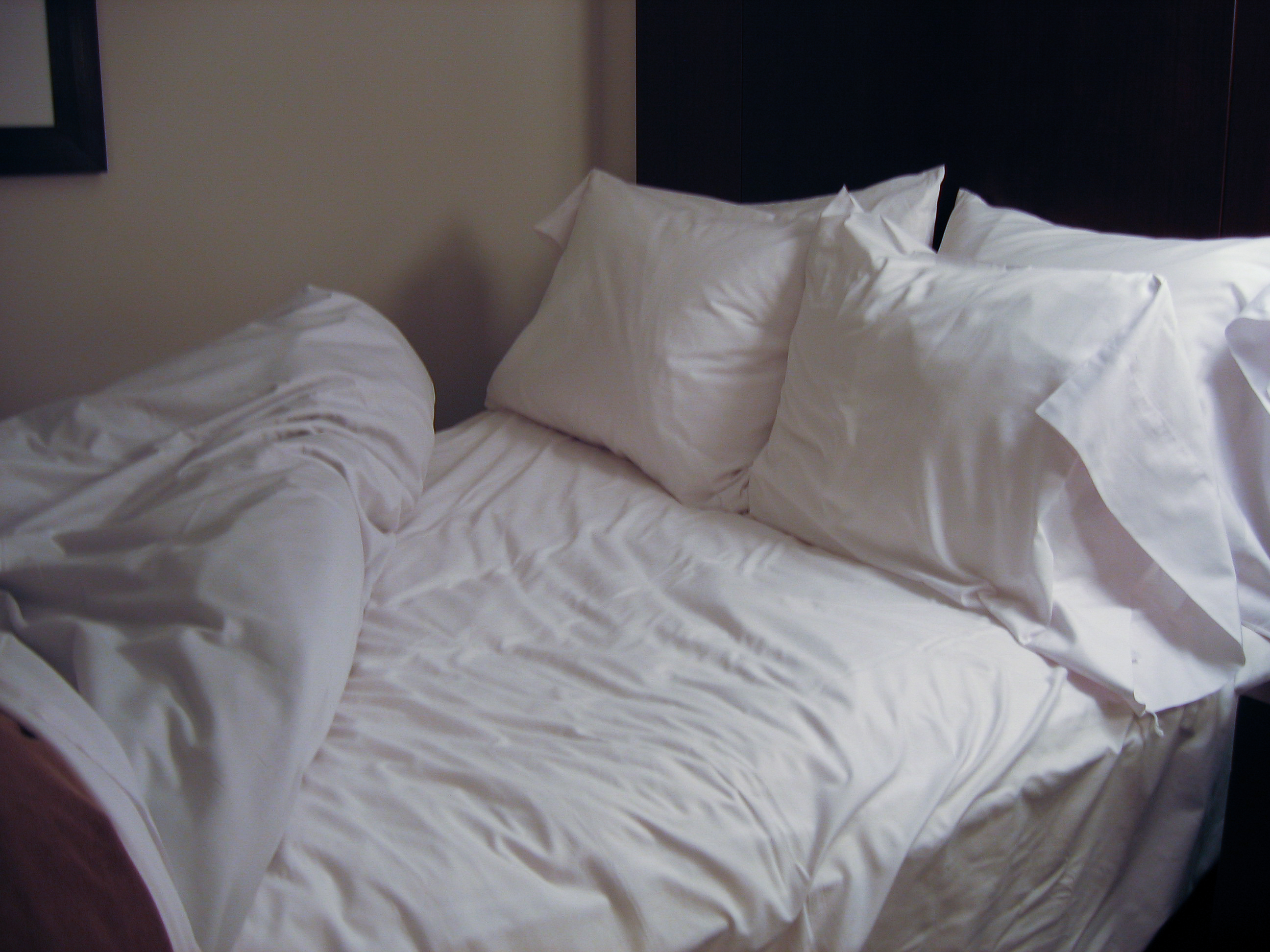
Several pillows on a bed.

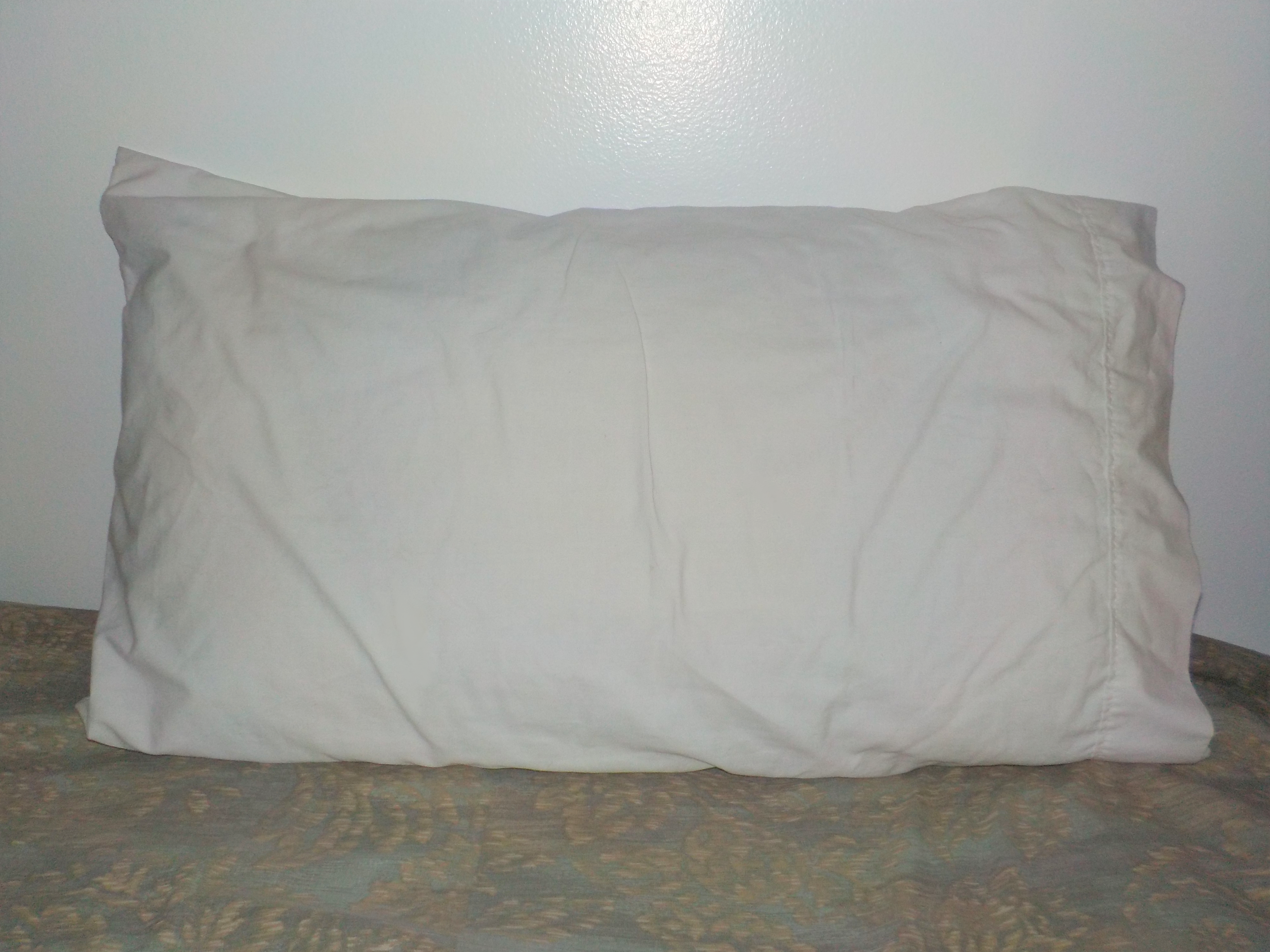
A typical pillow.

The classic bed pillow shape is usually a square or rectangle. In the US, they are common in these three sizes: Standard (20 in × 26 in (51 cm × 66 cm)), Queen (20 in × 30 in (51 cm × 76 cm)), and King (20 in × 36 in (51 cm × 91 cm)). In the US, a less common size is Jumbo (20 in × 28 in (51 cm × 71 cm)), which is larger than the Standard Size but smaller than the Queen Size.

Pillows are generally covered with a removable pillow case, which facilitates laundering. Apart from the color and from the material of which they are made, pillowcases have three contrasting characteristics:

- Size
- Features
- Opening/closing

Size conforms to the pillow the case is to contain. They are typically described as:

Standard
16 in × 16 in (41 cm × 41 cm) (square)
Square
26 in × 26 in (66 cm × 66 cm)
Standard
20 in × 26 in (51 cm × 66 cm)
Queen
20 in × 30 in (51 cm × 76 cm)
King
20 in × 36 in (51 cm × 91 cm)

Square is also called continental in the UK. German pillow sizes are 80 cm × 80 cm (31 in × 31 in) (older) or 40 cm × 80 cm (16 in × 31 in) (newer). When considered as a subset of bed pillows, Euro pillows finish 26 in × 26 in (66 cm × 66 cm) and older style travel pillows commonly finished 12 in × 16 in (30 cm × 41 cm).

The main distinguishing feature is whether the pillow case is plain or with a valance around the edge. In the former case this is described as 'plain style' and in the latter as 'Oxford style'.

"The Oxford pillowcase is usually described as having a decorative border of about 5-10cm around all four sides, giving it a framed look."

The opening/closure of pillow cases ranges from the straightforward "bag style" common in the United States to the "housewife style" more common in Europe, with a pocket inside the open end to fully contain the pillow.

"The Housewife pillowcase is designed with an internal flap at the open end, which tucks over the pillow to hold it securely inside."

Other methods of closure are ties or buttons/buttonholes.

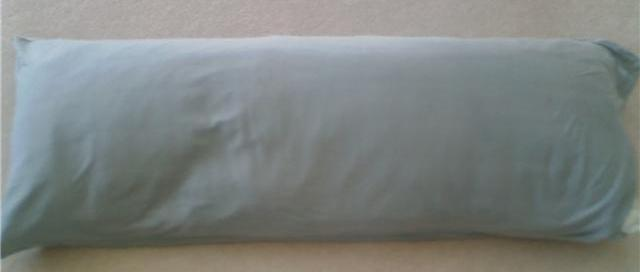
A body pillow with a light blue pillow case

Body pillows are as long as a full adult body, providing support to the head and neck at the top and to the knees and legs lower down. This type of pillow can be especially useful in providing support for those who sleep on their sides and for pregnant women. Size is 40 cm × 140 cm (16 in × 55 in). (See also: Dutch wife)

==== Bed pillow sizes ====
Location	Class	Dimension
Australia	Standard	48 cm × 73 cm (19 in × 29 in)
Australia	European	65 cm × 65 cm (26 in × 26 in)
United Kingdom	"Europe" Standard	65 cm × 65 cm (26 in × 26 in)
United Kingdom	"Europe" Continental	80 cm × 80 cm (31 in × 31 in)
Germany	Standard	80 cm × 80 cm (31 in × 31 in)
Germany	Small	40 cm × 80 cm (16 in × 31 in)
Denmark	Standard	60 cm × 60 cm (24 in × 24 in)
Netherlands, France	Standard	60 cm × 66 cm (24 in × 26 in)
Sweden	Standard	50 cm × 60 cm (20 in × 24 in)
Italy, Norway, Spain	Standard	50 cm × 70 cm (20 in × 28 in)
Poland	Standard	70 cm × 90 cm (28 in × 35 in)
United States	Standard	51 cm × 66 cm (20 in × 26 in)
United States	Jumbo	51 cm × 71 cm (20 in × 28 in)
United States	Queen	51 cm × 76 cm (20 in × 30 in)
United States	King	51 cm × 91 cm (20 in × 36 in)

=== Orthopedic ===
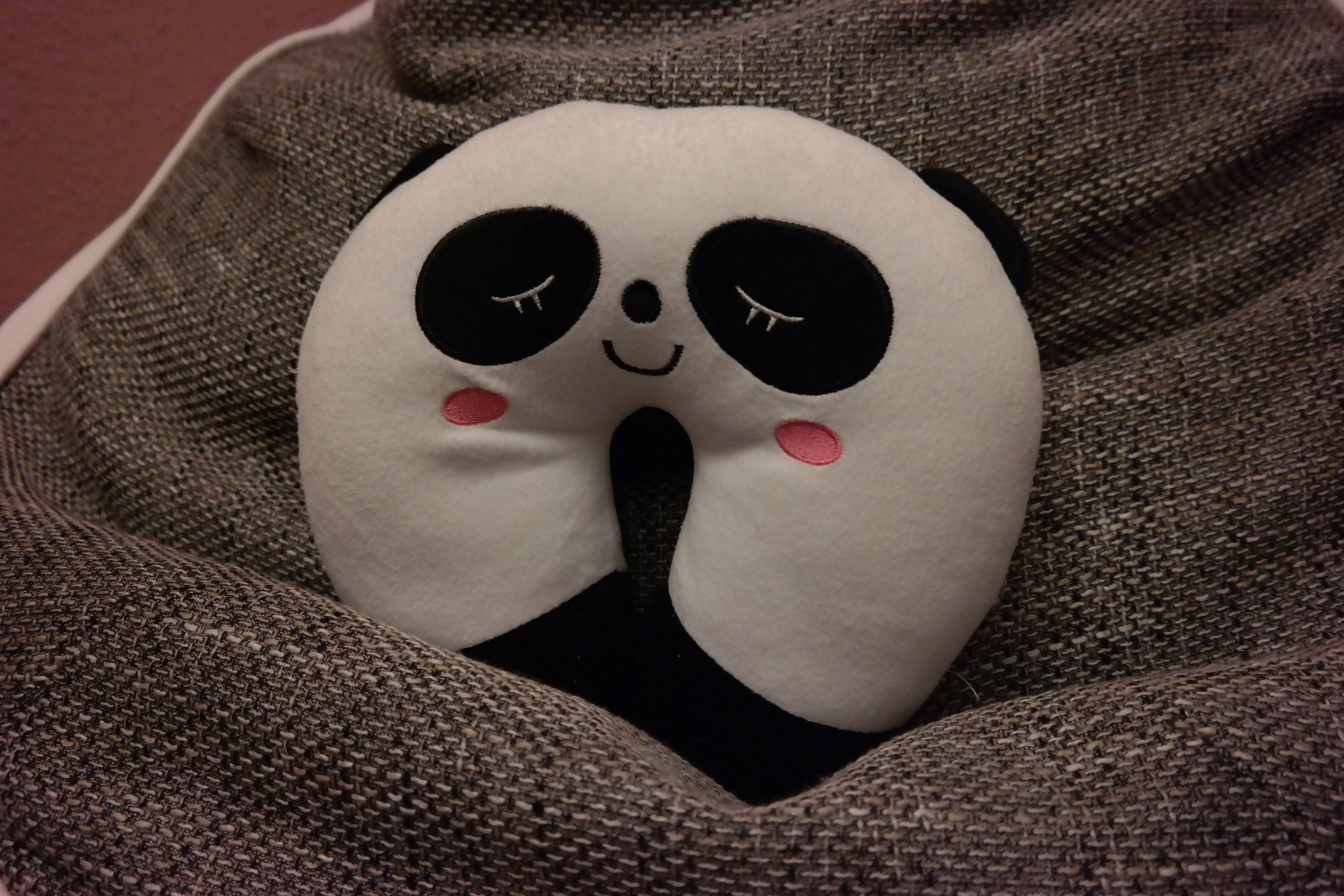
Panda shaped travel pillow.

Neck pillows support the neck by providing a deep area for the head to rest and a supportive area to keep the neck in alignment with the spine while sleeping. These can also be known as cervical pillows. Cervical pillows help patients to maintain comfortable positioning after therapeutic, orthopedic and surgical measures.

Travel pillows provide support for the neck in a sitting position. Their "U" shape fits around the back of the neck and keeps the head from slipping into an uncomfortable and possibly harmful position during sleep. However, U-shaped pillows can sometimes force the head forward, creating neck stiffness.

Doughnut pillows are firm pillows shaped like a torus, with a space in the middle to alleviate pressure on the tailbone area while sitting. These pillows are used primarily by individuals who have suffered an injury to the tailbone area, or who suffer pain from hemorrhoids or another ailment of the colon.

Lumbar pillows are designed to support the inward curve of the lower back, filling the space created between the lower back and the back of the chair when in a sitting position. These pillows are generally used to support the lower back while driving or sitting, such as in an office chair. Orthopedic pillows are similar to memory foam pillows.

=== Decorative ===
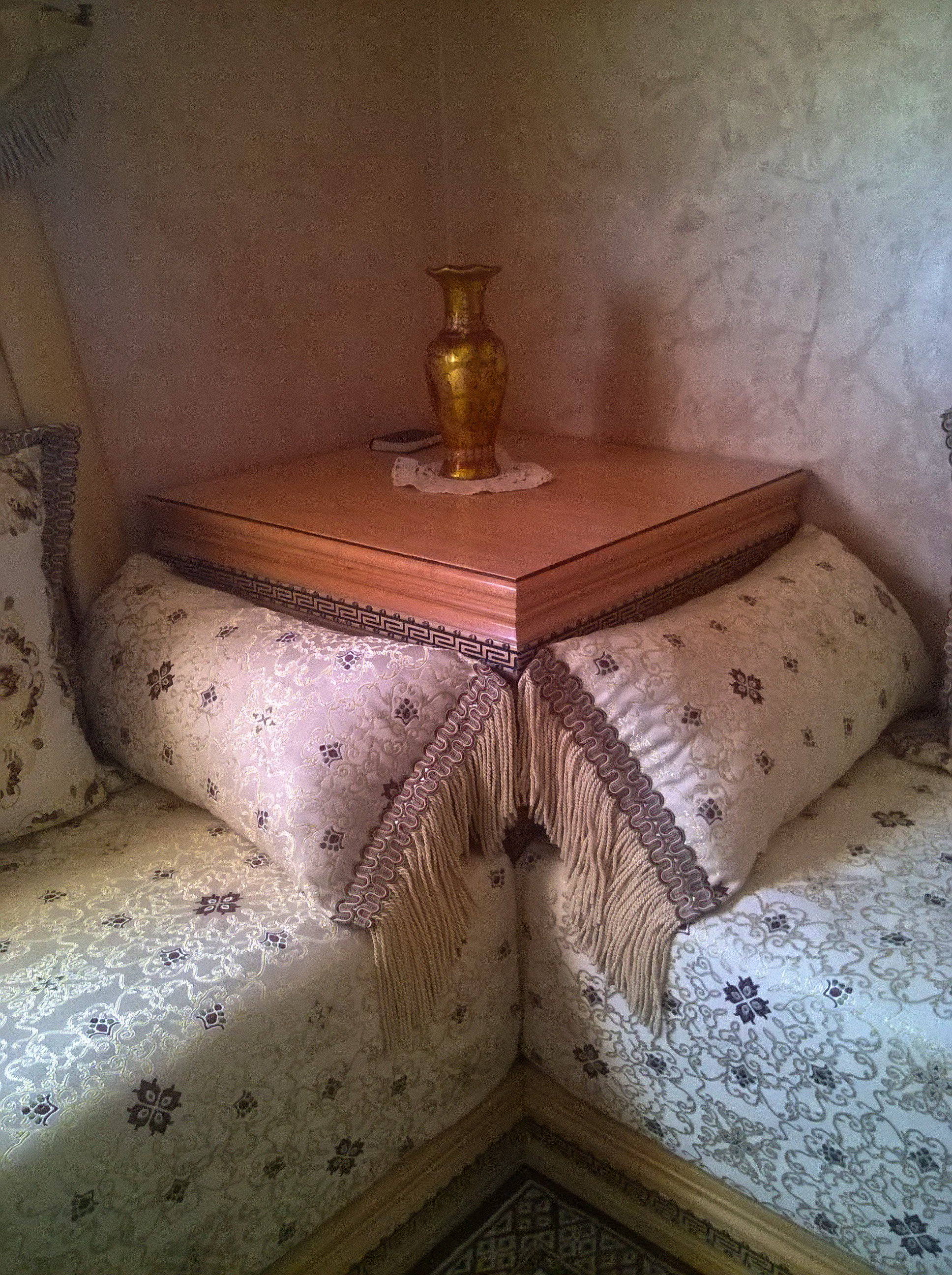
Decorated pillows piled on the corner of a sofa.

Decorative pillows serve a dual purpose. They often have fancy cover material which serves to decorate the room where they are found. Since decorative textiles are commonly 54 inches in width, many decorative pillows finish about 17x17 inches. (54/3 = 18, less seam allowance) When used to decorate a fully made up bed, decorative pillows are likely thrown aside at bedtime, since they are not covered with a washable pillow case, thus, while found on the bed, they are primarily there for decoration, hence they fall under this category. These pillows may be custom made, as well as made by freelancers.

Decorative pillows are also found on furnishings in more public parts of the home, such as sofas, chairs and window seats. Here, their common use may overlap both orthopedic and bed pillows. For example, unless a person has some particular medical condition, they will likely use a handy decorative pillow for lumbar support, as needed, while seated on a sofa. Likewise, for the occasional nap, decorative pillows are handy for supporting the head or neck, even though they may not be covered with a pillow case, as are bed pillows.

There are five common synonyms for decorative pillows which are descriptive of their use in the home. "Accent" pillows emphasize or accent some other part of the home decor. The terms "sofa pillow" and "couch pillow" refer to the place these decorative pillows are likely found. The terms "toss pillow" and "throw pillow" may refer to the way they generally arrive in their places.

Novelty pillows are shaped like humorous objects (a banana, tweety bird, a human leg, a chainsaw, a dill pickle, a former president) and are meant to brighten up and add humor to a room or lounge area.

Tent-flap pillows are placed at the front of a stack of pillows decorating a bed. These pillows have a separate flap of fabric that is attached at the top of the pillow and folds down over the face. The tent flap can be loose or tacked down; if the flap is loose a decorative tassel or bead is usually used to weigh the flap down so it hangs properly.

Floor pillows are another subset of decorative pillows. These pillows often finish 26×26 inches (one half of the width of the textile, less seam allowance).

=== Combination pillow ===
A combination pillow is a pillow which is for sleepers who sleep in a combination of positions and would like to use their pillow to hug or play.

== Culture ==
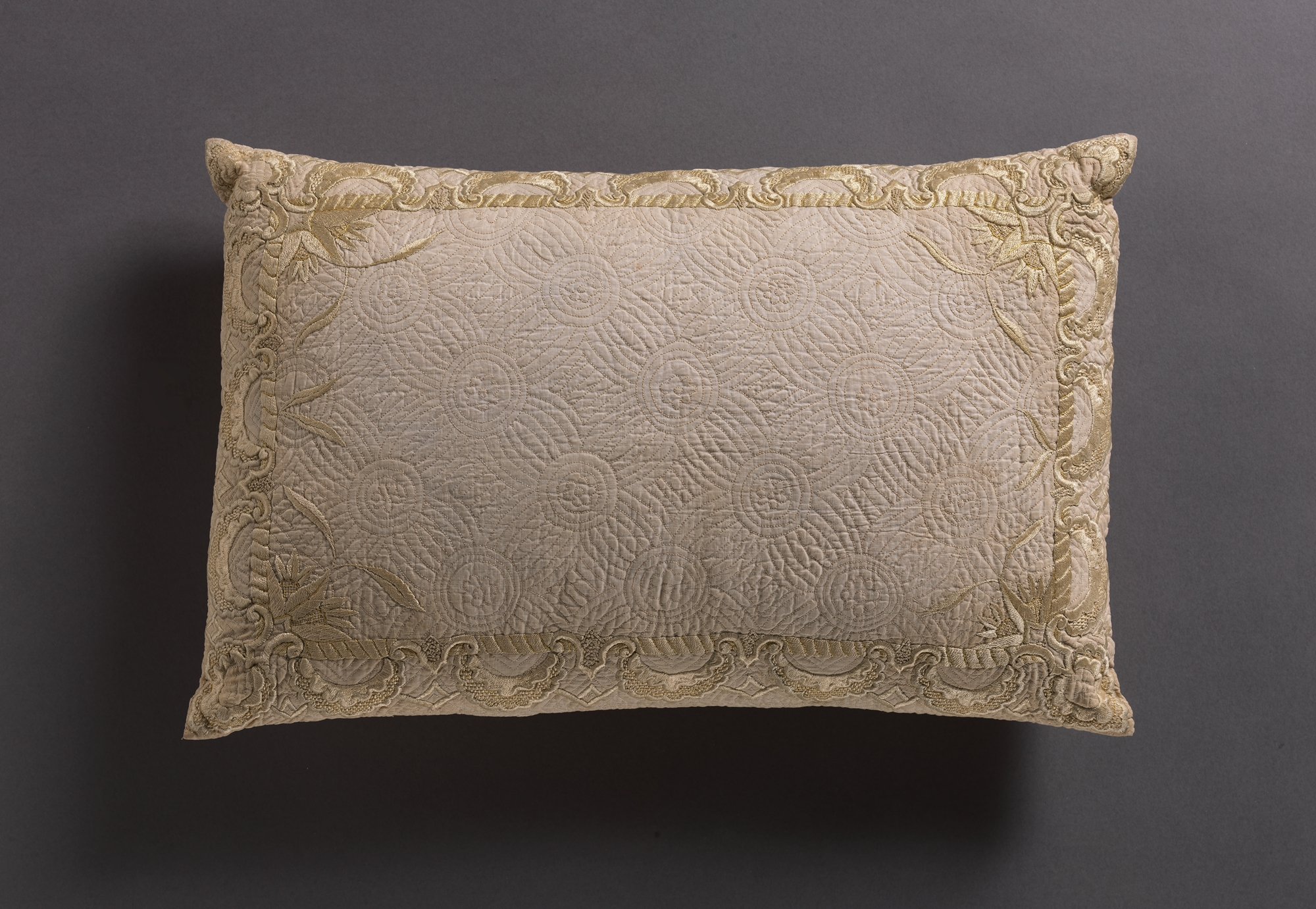
An 18th-century embroidered British pillow.

In many parts of the world, pillows have cultural significance, and references have extended to a wide variety of other uses, forms and activities.

=== Comfort pillows ===
In some cultures, pillows have forms for hugging. An example is the Dakimakura, a kind of "hugging pillow" originating in Japan that has been endowed with anthropomorphic and zoomorphic qualities and pop culture references for additional psychological comfort. Other types of hugging pillows are more practical, such as the Guling, long hugging pillow originating from Indonesia and the Abrazador, a long hugging pillow originating from the Philippines. A husband pillow (also known as a boyfriend pillow) is a large, high-backed pillow with two "arms." It is used to prop the user upright while in bed or on the floor, as for reading or watching television. Because of this common use, a husband pillow is also called a reading pillow.

=== Activities ===
==== Pillow fighting ====
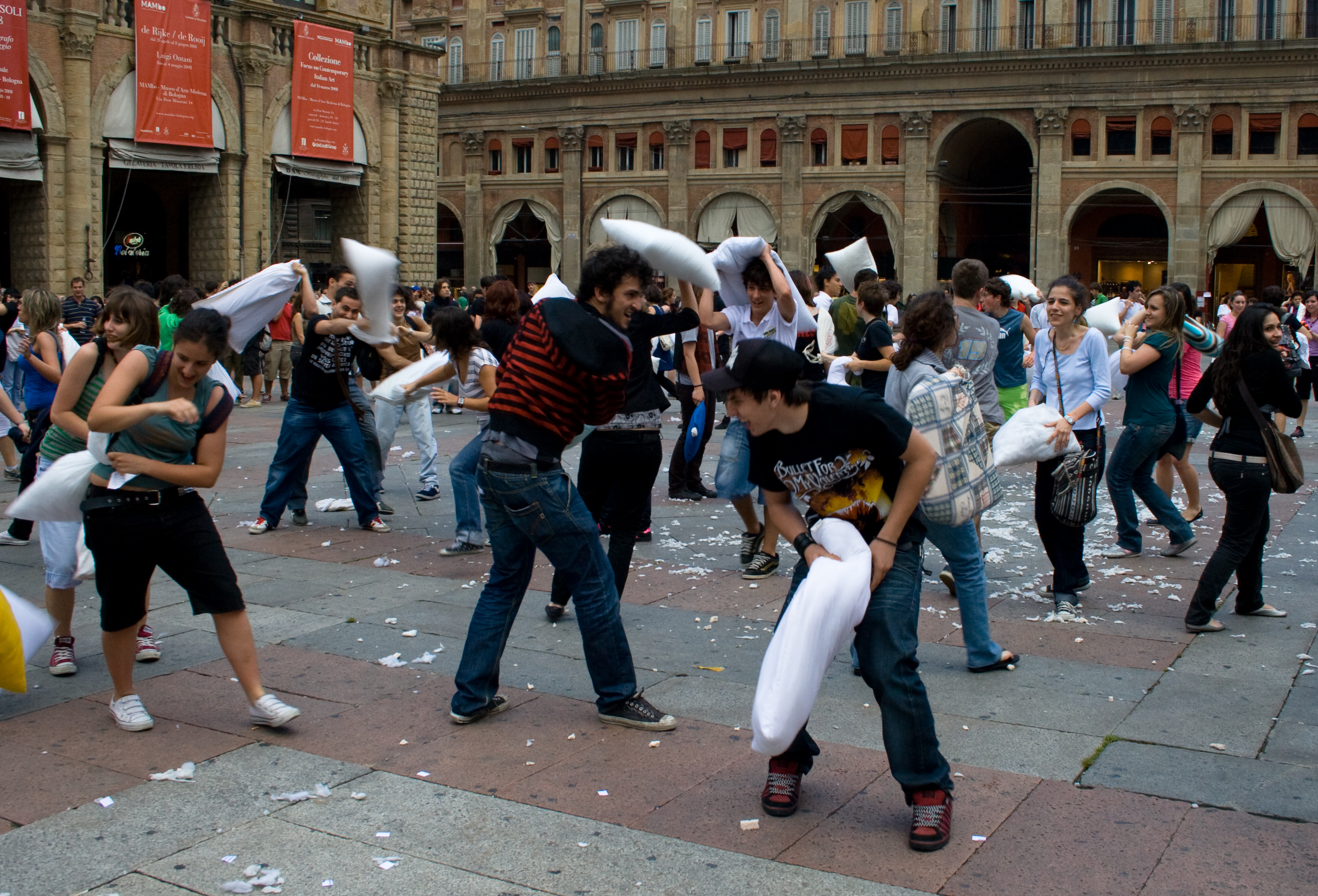
Large public pillow fight.

A pillow fight is a common game mostly played by young children (but also by teens and adults) in which they engage in mock physical conflict, using pillows as weapons.

Pillow fights are known to occasionally occur during children's sleepovers. Since pillows are usually soft, injuries rarely occur. The heft of a pillow can still knock a young person off balance, especially on a soft surface such as a bed, which is a common venue. In earlier eras, pillows would often break, shedding feathers throughout a room. Modern pillows tend to be stronger and are often filled with a solid block of artificial filling, so breakage occurs far less frequently.

==== Pillow talk ====
Pillow talk refers to the relaxed, intimate conversation that often occurs between two sexual partners after sexual activity, usually accompanied by cuddling, caresses, and other physical intimacy. It is associated with honesty, sexual afterglow, and bonding. In the Western world there are many cultural references to pillow talk.

=== Chinese rock pillows ===
Chinese rock pillows (simplified Chinese: 石头枕头; traditional Chinese: 石頭枕頭; pinyin: shítou zhěntou) played an important role in ancient China. Made from jade, they were believed to translate the energy from the stone to the human brain. Originating in the Ming dynasty, this piece of material was trusted to cure headaches or depression, or simply to better the intelligence of those who use it. It was more common among royalty because it was expensive and rare. Families often married off children based on the quality and intricacy of these pillows. Today, rock pillows are still commonly used during the hot summer months in China.

=== Pillows for parts of the body ===
Cushioning designed for specific parts of the body are sometimes called pillows. An example is eye pillows which are designed to comfort the eyes. Some mousemats feature wrist rests, that while not generally called pillows, are another example.

=== Sex pillows ===
Large light gray sex pillow

A sex pillow is a specially-designed and typically firm pillow used to enhance sexual intercourse. An ordinary firm pillow, however, may be used in place of a special one. Some contain a high-density urethane core to balance firm support with softness. In addition to more common pillow shapes, there are wedge-shaped, ramp-shaped, prism-shaped, etc. pillows which lend themselves to various sexual positions, some of which might be difficult or uncomfortable without them. A very common use of a sex pillow is to place it under the receiving partner's buttocks or hips before assuming the missionary position; this pivots the pelvis and increases depth of penetration.

=== Pillow menu ===
A pillow menu is a list of available pillows provided by a hotel to guests, usually free of charge. It allows guests to make an alternative pillow choice. Some common pillow alternatives are memory foam, buckwheat hull, and hypoallergenic. Some hotels offer pillows to treat specific conditions such as headaches or stress.

== See also ==
- Bedding
- Bolster
- Cushion
- Duvet
- Mattress
- Sachet (scented bag)
- Upholstery
- Water pillow
