= Bolster =

Long narrow pillow or cushion

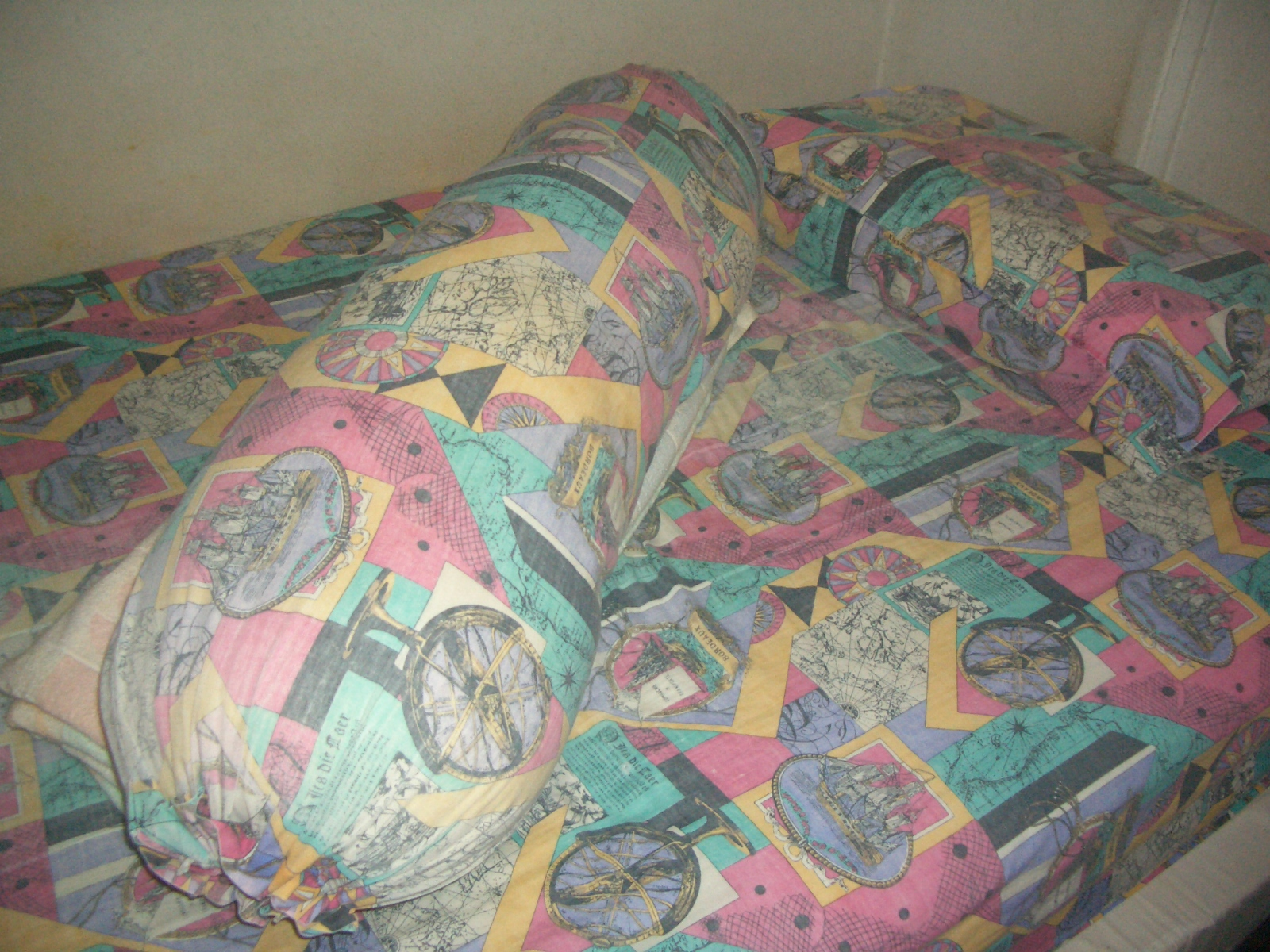
Bed with pillow (right) and bolster (left)

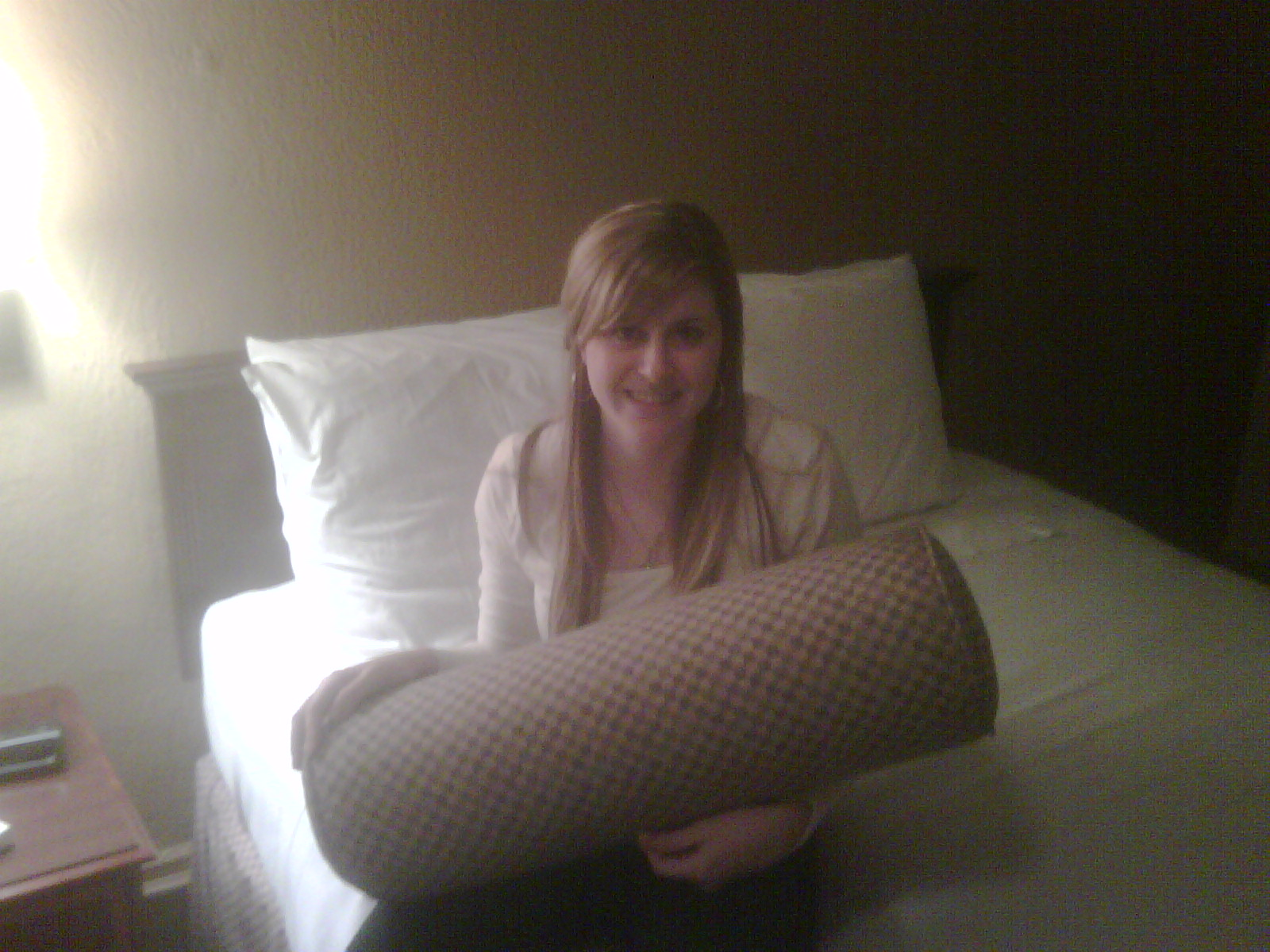
A bolster pillow

A bolster is a long narrow pillow or cushion filled with cotton, down or fibre. Bolsters are usually firm for back or arm support or for decorative application. They are not a standard size or shape and commonly have a zipper or hook-and-loop enclosure. A foam insert is sometimes used for additional support. A bolster is also referred to as a cushion, a pillow and a prop. A bolster pillow is a common shape for lace pillows.

== Etymology ==
The word is from both Middle and Old English, and is a cognate of the Old English belg, 'bag'. The first known use of the word bolster was before the 12th century.

== Southeast and South Asia ==
In Southeast Asian countries, in particular Vietnam, the Philippines, Indonesia, Cambodia, Malaysia, Myanmar, Singapore, and Thailand, the bolster is designed to be hugged when sleeping. In Vietnam, it is known as gối ôm ('hugging pillow') or pillowy, while in the Philippines, the traditional dantayan is also colloquially known as a 'hotdog pillow'. Cambodians call it a ខ្នើយអោប, which directly translates to 'hug pillow'. Malaysians call it bantal peluk ('hug pillow'), and Indonesians call it guling ('roll pillow'). In Indonesia, it is also known colloquially as a Dutch Wife as it is believed that the pillow was invented by Dutch colonialists. In Thailand, it is known as หมอนข้าง (monkhang); หมอน (mon) means 'pillow' and ข้าง (khang) means 'beside'.

In India and Pakistan, a type of bolster is known there as a lode (in Marathi), gao-takkiya, masnad masland, or paash-baalish/kol-baalish (in Bengali), tool viharo (in Sindhi) and is used for back support aside from hugging during sleep.

== East Asia ==
In China, it is called bàozhěn in Mandarin (simplified: 抱枕, 'hugging pillow'), while in Cantonese it is known as laam^{2} zam^{2} (traditional: 攬枕; pinyin: lǎn zhěn).

Bolsters are called dakimakura (抱き枕) in Japan. Tradition suggests that a wife would fashion the bolster made of bamboo and give it to her husband when he travelled away from home so that he would not be lonely at night, hence the alternative terms bamboo wife, Dutch wife, or chikufujin (竹夫人).

In Korea, it is referred to as a jukbuin (죽부인), from the words juk ('bamboo') and puin ('wife'). A jukbuin is used in the summer months to cool down while sleeping, since its hollow construction from thin bamboo strips allows air to flow through the pillow. A person tightly wraps their arms and legs around the jukbuin while sleeping.

== Western countries ==
In western countries, a bolster is usually placed at the head of one's bed and functions as head or lower back support, or as an arm support on furniture with high rigid sides. Bolster pillows are also used as bumpers in cribs and for lounging on the floor in family and children's rooms.

In the United States, body pillows resemble bolsters and are designed to be hugged when sleeping.

In Denmark and Norway, it is called a pølle.

In France, it is called a traversin or polochon and is mostly used as a pillow, especially by the elderly in rural areas, but also for summer camps.

== See also ==
- Truck bolster
