= Bamboo wife =

Type of Asian pillow

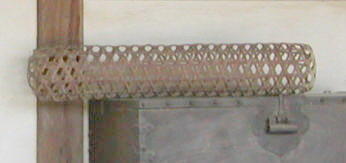
The Korean version of the bamboo wife

A bamboo wife is a bolster (pillow) made from a woven bamboo cylinder that may be as large as the size of the human body. It goes by names such as (Chinese: 竹夫人; pinyin: zhúfūrén; Cantonese Yale: jūkfūyàhn; Vietnamese: trúc phu nhân; Korean: 죽부인; RR: jukbuin; Japanese: chikufujin), also known as a Dutch wife, in Tagalog as kawil (fish hook or chain); in Burmese as ဖက်လုံး (hpaat lone), in Indonesian as guling. Lao: ເມຍຂອງໄມ້ໄຜ່ (Miakhong Maiphai). Khmer: ប្រពន្ធដើមឫស្សី (Braponthodaem Ryssaei)

Bamboo wives are typically hand-woven from thinly-cut bamboo cane.

== Etymology ==
=== Mandarin Chinese ===
Besides the term "Bamboo wife" (竹夫人, zhúfūrén) these pillows are known in Mandarin Chinese under a variety of names, namely Zhú jiā xī (竹夹膝), zhú jī (竹姬), qīng nú (青奴), zhú nú (竹奴), and zhú fēi (竹妃).

== Shape and size ==
Bamboo wives come in a variety of sizes. They are typically similar in shape to orthopedic body pillows, and can be curved or a long, cylindrical shape.

== Usage ==
In the summer heat, the open bamboo structure is cooler to the touch than fabric pillows or sheets. A user embraces the bamboo wife as they would hold a sleeping companion, with the goal of exposing the body to a greater flow of air. It can also be imagined as a partner of the user, providing a sense of comfort. The device may also alleviate lower back pain when placed between the knees during sleep.

== History ==
Bamboo wives and their variants in other countries originated East Asia and Southeast Asia. They were designed to cool the body in times of high temperature and humidity. They can also be made of cotton or other synthetic fibers. Dutch wives made of cotton or other synthetic fiber are widely used in Indonesia.

Bamboo wives have decreased in popularity, possibly due to the prevalence of air conditioning, especially in urban areas. Another reason for the decline may be poor quality. They remain popular in Korea, but are outweighed by indoor cooling and bolsters made from synthetic materials.

As of 2019, bamboo wives were not typically sold at corner stores, tourist shops, or night markets in Japan, Korea or the Philippines. They are mostly found in non-English online shops.

== Japan ==
In Japan, full-body pillows (dakimakura) are sometimes referred to as chikufujin (竹夫人 "bamboo wife") even though their function is about physical and psychological comfort rather than heat abatement.

== Korea ==
The first mention of the jukbuin in Korea dates to the 13th century during the late Goryeo period. Jukbuin were typically held when sleeping on the wooden floors of a Hanok as beds were not commonly used. Generally speaking, family members did not each have a personal jukbuin. However, a son would never use his father's jukbuin in order to show him respect.

Every year the Damyang Bamboo Festival is held in Damyang County, South Jeolla Province, South Korea which showcases local products made from bamboo, including an array of jukbuin.

Jukbuin for infants arrived after the adult versions. Other jukbuin variations include an electric fan.

== Culture ==
=== Films ===
Because chikufujin are hand-woven from cheap materials, they are sometimes used in media to connote the poverty of their creators. In the Japanese film Lady Snowblood, a supporting character (Kobue) pretends to make her living by weaving chikufujin to conceal her profession as a prostitute from her father.

=== Riddles ===
Certain Chinese numismatic charms reference bamboo wives in the form of a riddle that reads, "Empty eye without eyeball. The couple live together without love. In autumn the wife leaves. When the lotus blooms again she returns," the answer to which is the bamboo wife.
