= Eye pillow =

Pouches covering the eyes to aid sleep

Eye pillows, also known as dream pillows, are mask-shaped or rectangular pouches made from a fabric such as cotton or silk and filled with scented or non-scented herbs.

== Uses ==
At one time, eye pillows were called comfort pillows and were used in sick rooms to ease nightmares and to disguise the scent of illness. Herbs such as flax seed, lavender, chamomile, eucalyptus, and rose petals were used as fillers in eye pillows to help comfort the sick and ease them to sleep. Lavender is said to be a natural anti-depressant which helps in soothing insomnia, stress, and headaches.

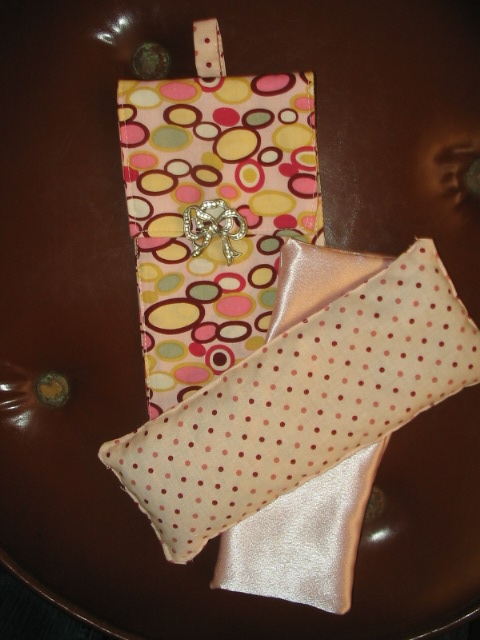
Homemade eye pillow

Eye pillows are typically used to shield the eyes from light and to apply a gentle, relaxing weight over and around the eyes. They are also used to stimulate the oculocardiac reflex and lower the heart rate, helping to activate the parasympathetic nervous system.

== See also ==
- Sachet (scented bag)
