= Dakimakura =

Type of large pillow from Japan

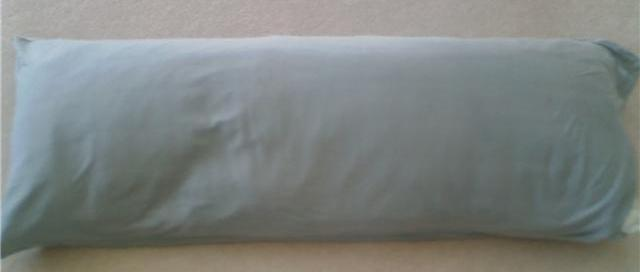
A dakimakura without a cover on it

A dakimakura (抱き枕; from daki 抱き "embrace" and makura 枕 "pillow") is a type of large pillow from Japan usually coupled with pillow covers depicting manga and anime characters. The word is often translated as body pillow, waifu pillow, or husbando pillow. Dakimakura are similar to Western orthopedic body pillows and are commonly used by Japanese youth as "comfort objects".

== History ==
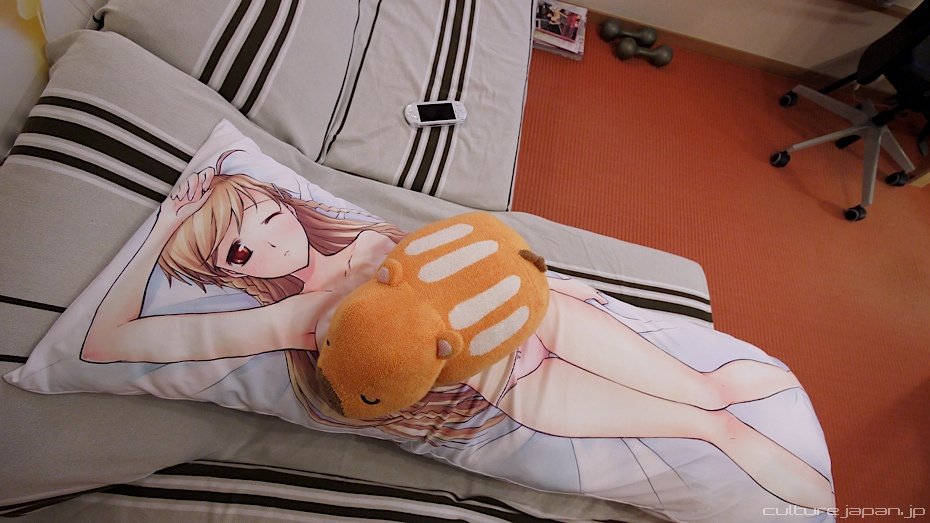
A dakimakura featuring the character Mirai Suenaga

During the late '90s and early 2000s, dakimakura began to intertwine with otaku culture, leading to the production of pillow covers featuring printed images of bishōjo and bishōnen posed lying down from various anime or bishōjo games. Many of these early otaku dakimakura covers were released by Cospa, a character goods and apparel store that as of 2018 continues to release official dakimakura covers.

Although dakimakura are sometimes called "Dutch wife", the original definition of this phrase is closer to the chikufujin, or "bamboo wife". The year 2015 saw some of the first talking body pillows with Ita-Supo and its mascot, Rina Makuraba. It was invented by former Kyushu Institute of Technology researcher Koichi Uchimura.

== Sizes ==
Dakimakura are available in two main sizes, 160 or 150 cm (63 or 59 in) in length with a 50 cm (20 in) width (100 cm (39 in) circumference).

Until the mid-2000s, dakimakura were available in one size, 160 cm × 50 cm (63 in × 20 in). Since the late 2000s, 150 cm × 50 cm (59 in × 20 in) dakimakura have been available and increasingly popular due to shipping cost savings from being under the 2 kg (4 lb 7 oz) airmail weight limit.

Due to the increase in popularity, new sizes have been created to adapt to all heights and ages, and although there are other sizes available; the five most popular sizes are 180 cm × 60 cm (71 in × 24 in), 170 cm × 60 cm (67 in × 24 in), 160 cm × 60 cm (63 in × 24 in), 150 cm × 50 cm, and 140 cm × 40 cm (55 in × 16 in).

== See also ==
- Co-sleeping
- Sex doll
- Bolster
- Bamboo wife
- 3D mousepad
