= Contour leg pillow =

Pillow placed between the legs during sleep

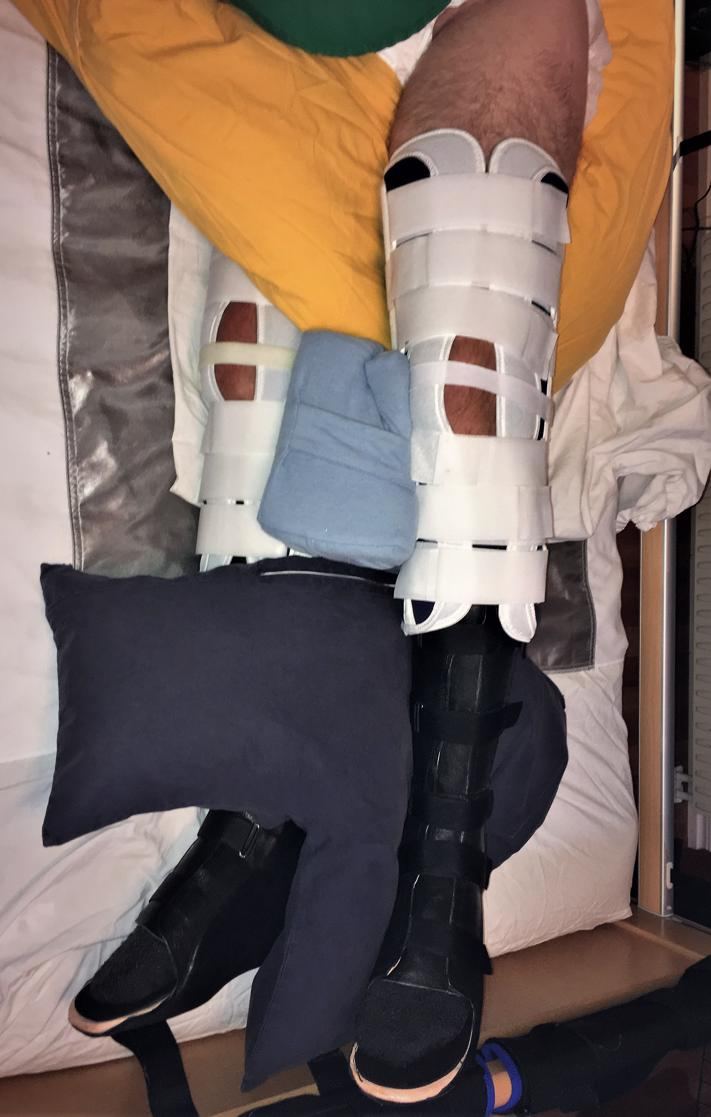
Contour pillows support patient with knee and foot orthoses

A contour leg pillow is a pillow placed between the legs, usually at knee level, during sleep. They are believed to relieve lower back pain.

These pillows provide alignment of the pelvis, and prevent friction between the legs while sleeping.
