= Orthopedic pillow =

Pillow that corrects the user's body position

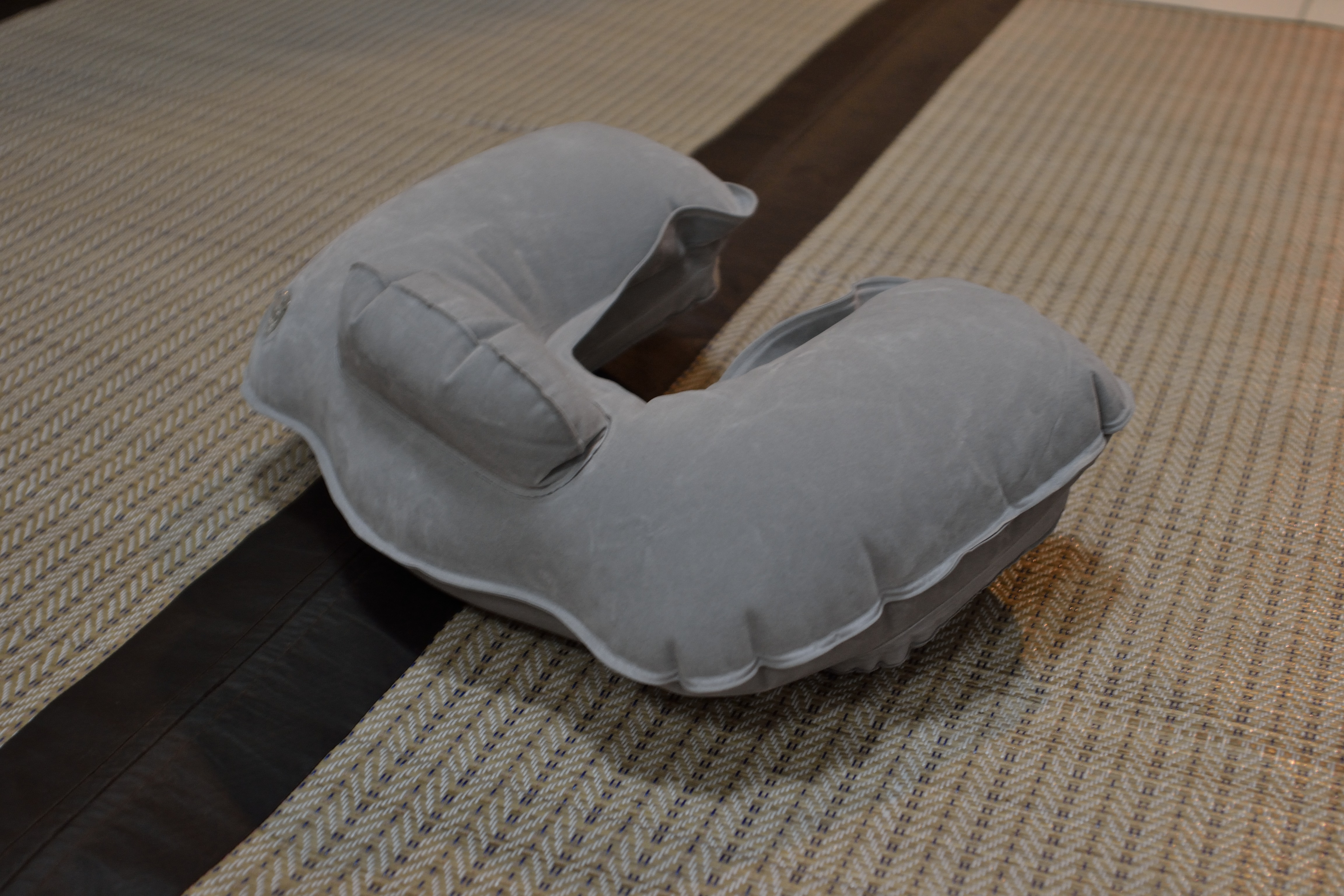
A travel pillow

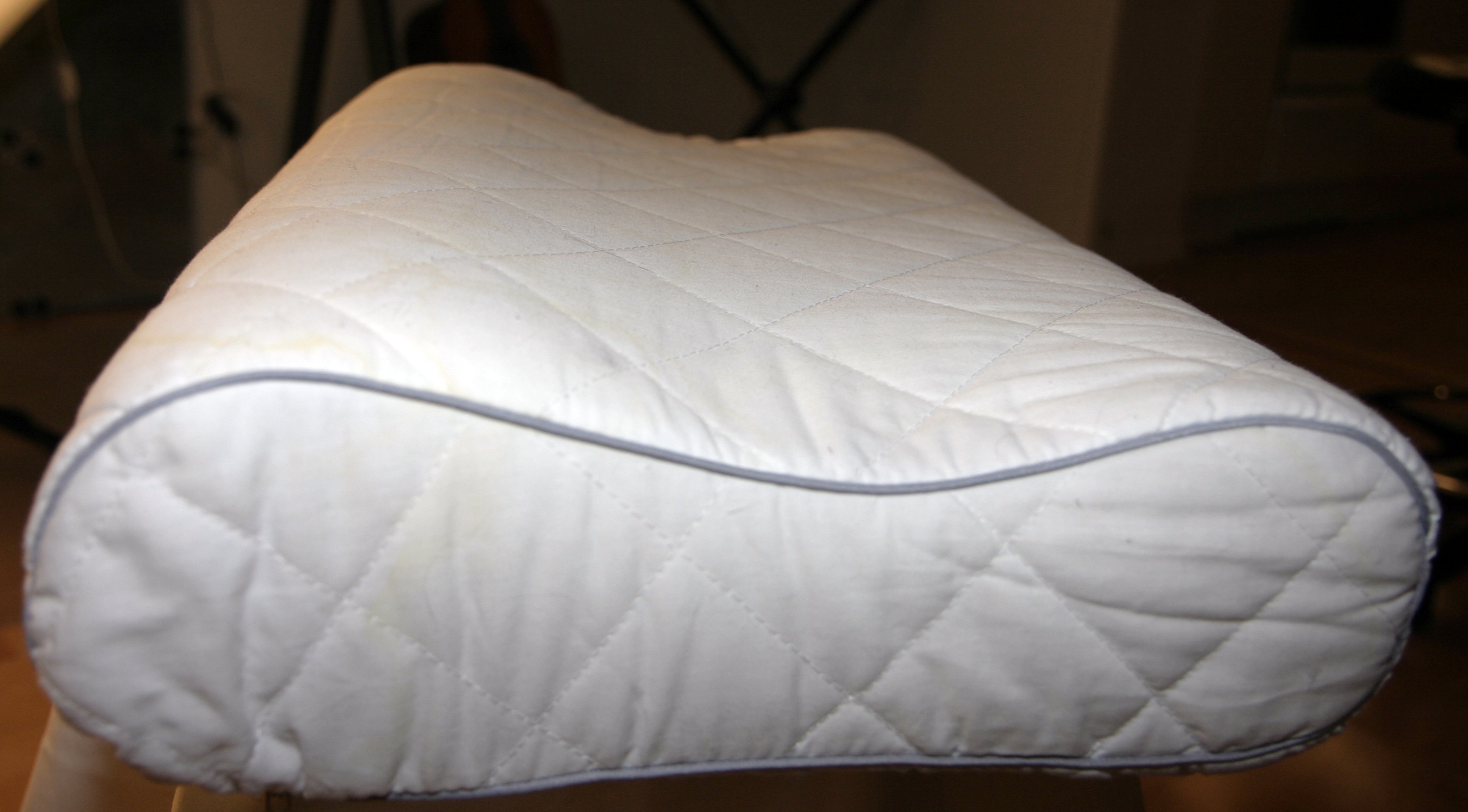
An ergonomic pillow

An orthopedic pillow is a pillow designed to correct body positioning in bed or while lying on any other surface. Its design conforms to orthopedic guidelines to ensure the right placement and support of one or more specific parts of the body to provide safe and healthy rest to the sleeper.

Pillows have been traditionally made of foam and fiber, but other types now exist, such as pillows made of memory foam, a heat sensitive material that can acquire the shape of the body lying upon it. It may or may not recover its original shape immediately when the body is removed from the pillow.

Orthopedic pillows are regarded as therapeutic pillows based on claims that they can help relieve various conditions including sleep apnoea, snoring, insomnia, breathing difficulty, blood circulation problems, acid reflux, gastroesophageal reflux disease, lower back pain, sciatica pain, neck pain, whiplash, and rotator cuff injury, amongst others.

There are many types of orthopedic pillows for almost every part of the human body, as well as orthopedic beds, mattresses, top mattresses, supports and cushions for different orthopedic problems. Some of them have multi-purpose and multi-position designs for different physical ailments and sleep disorders.

== Types ==
- Cervical pillow or contour pillow: A sleep pillow with a curved design that adapts to head, neck and shoulder contour for back sleepers and side sleepers. May relieve neck pain, frozen shoulder, stiff neck and headaches, and may help breathing to reduce snoring and sleep apnoea symptoms.
- Neck pillow or travel pillow: Pillow shaped like a horseshoe to fit around the neck, mostly used by travelers to keep their necks straight while sleeping sitting up on board planes or other vehicles.
- Wedge pillow: triangle-shaped pillow that gives a slope for placing the body in a diagonal position. It can be used in an upright or downright position. This pillow is multipurpose; however, they are mainly used to relieve the symptoms of acid reflux and gastroesophageal reflux disease (GERD) during sleep.
- Lumbar pillow: Half-moon shaped pillow used at the lower back to comfort and relieve lumbar pain and keep a correct sitting-down position. Likewise, they are used underneath knees for leg elevation and as a neck support for relaxation and massage.
- Knee pillow: Also known as contour leg pillow. Hourglass-shaped pillow that, when placed between the legs, allows the lower body to keep a straight side-sleeping position. Some leg wedge pillows can be unfolded and turned into leg spacers to boost blood circulation in the legs.
- Body pillow: Long curved pillow for total body support that cradles head, neck, shoulders, back, lower back, legs and knees. Replaces other pillows and supports side sleepers.
- Buckwheat pillow: A bed pillow filled with buckwheat hulls. Buckwheat pillows have a moldable shape, so they can be adjusted to the shape of the head, neck and shoulders.
- Spinal support pillow: Orthopedic back pillow used for cervical support while sleeping.
- Donut pillow: Pillow with a recess in the centre to protect parts of the body from uncomfortable pressure.
- Coccyx cushion (tailbone cushion): A seat cushion with a posterior cut-out (often U-shaped or wedge-shaped) intended to reduce direct pressure on the coccyx during sitting by allowing the coccyx to hover over the empty area. Commercially available versions are commonly made from viscoelastic (memory) foam or gel, and some designs combine a rear cut-out with a central opening (hybrid designs).

== Sleep positions ==
The most common sleep positions people adopt in bed are:

=== Side sleeping ===
Side sleeping is the most common of the three. According to the Sleep Assessment and Advisory Service, two out of three people sleep on their sides. This position is considered the most suitable because it reduces the incidences of snoring, sleep apnoea and obstructive sleep apnoea; it helps release breathing airways; and it is the most helpful position for pregnant women to reduce the pressure of their wombs. It is twice as common in women as in men.

The inconvenience of this position is that most of the body's pressure relies over arms and shoulders which produce neck stiffness and frozen shoulder. This can be solved with a side sleeper pillow that allows the correct placement of neck, arms and shoulders.

=== Back sleeping ===
Unlike side sleeping, this position may favour episodes of snoring and sinusitis, as well as back pain. This position requires a soft but firm support for three critical curves of the body: behind the neck, in the middle of the back and lower back. For this, an orthopedic pillow with neck contour and a wedge under knees can allow the back sleeper to lie with safety and comfort.

=== Stomach sleeping ===
More common in infants and small children than in adults, this sleep position is considered harmful for the neck (neck strain, neck pain and stiffness) and responsible of the incidence of sudden infant death syndrome (SIDS) in babies as small children, according to a study by the U.S. National Institute of Child Health and Human Development (NICHD), the National Institute on Deafness and other Communication Disorders, and the Centers for Disease Control and Prevention.

Orthopedic pillows are sometimes used during massages to cushion the face when clients lie facedown. The pillow is usually placed over a hole in the massage table, so clients can comfortably lie on their stomach with their face comfortably cushioned by the pillow, able to breathe through the hole.

== Gallery ==
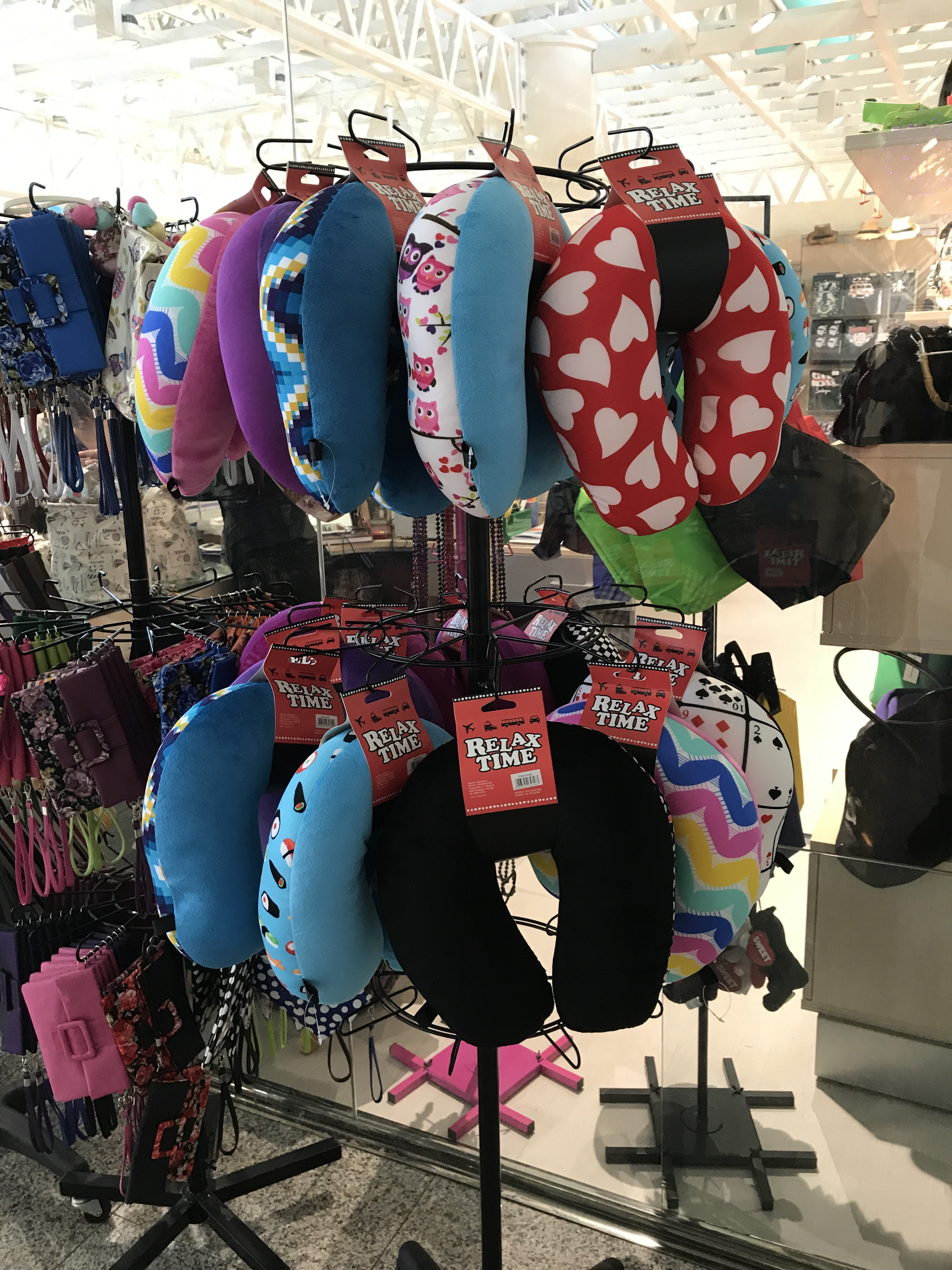
Travel pillows at airport

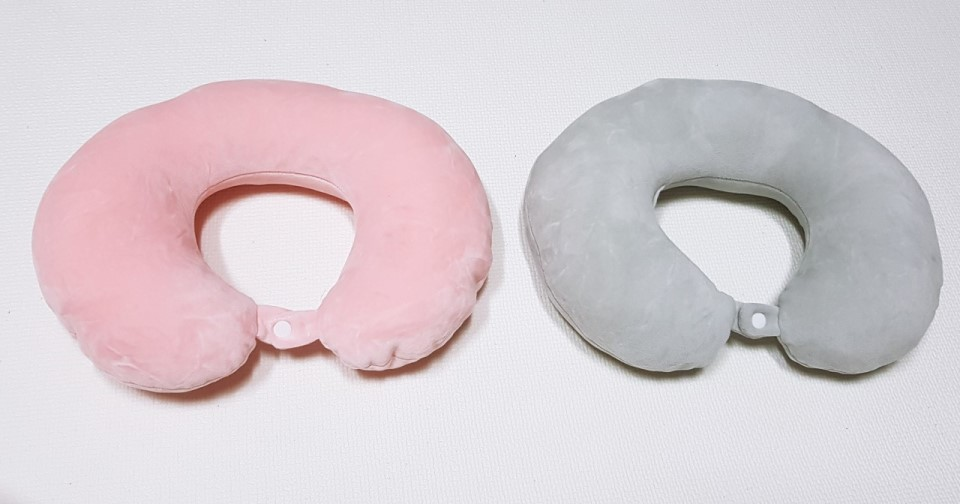

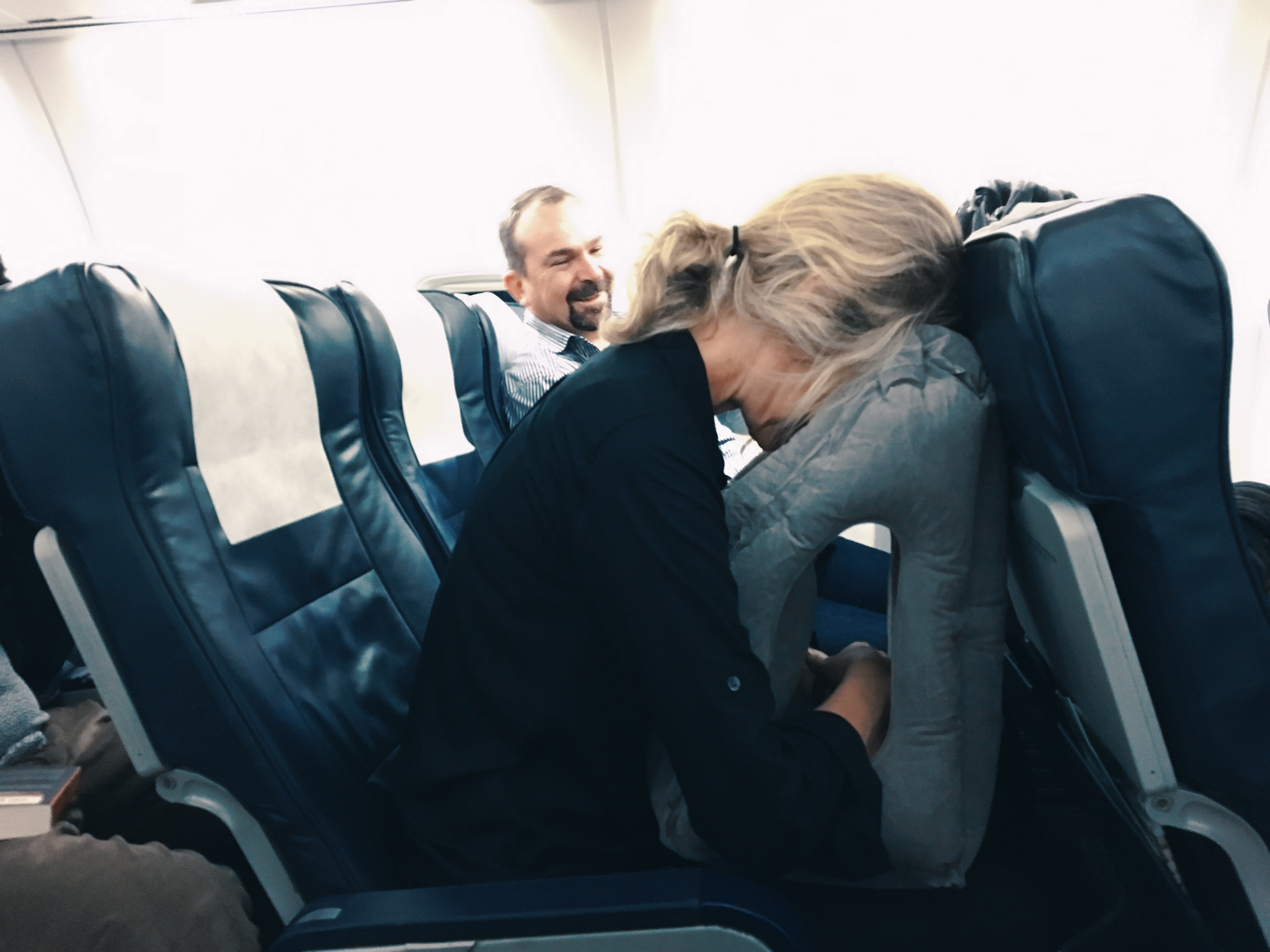
Person sleeping in plane in travel pillow

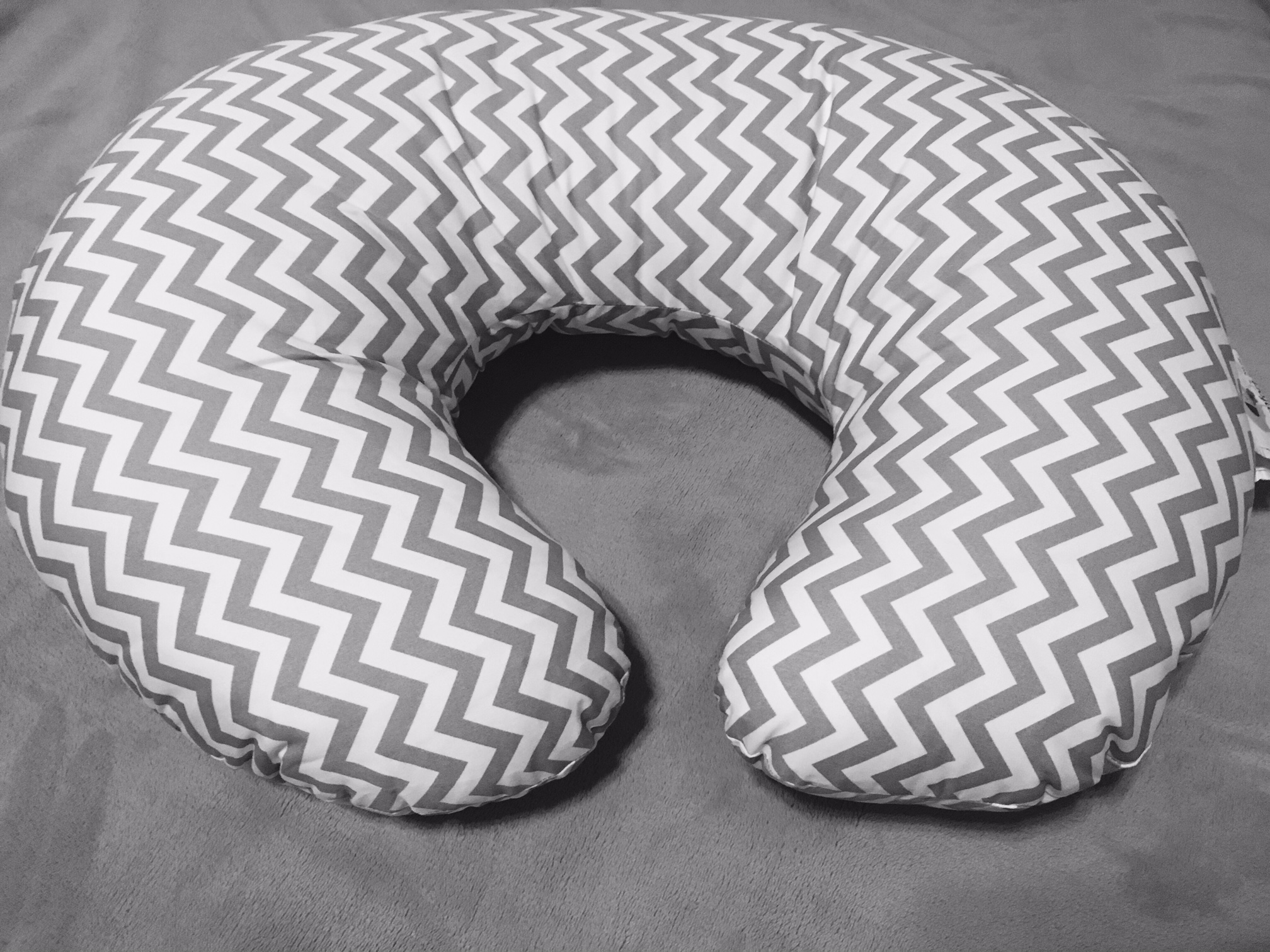
Prenatal pillow

== See also ==
- Orthopedic mattress
