= Donut pillow =

Ring-shaped pillow

Donut pillow, donut cushion or doughnut cushion is a designation for different types of pillows, all named after the shape of the pastry donut. There are donut pillows as seat cushions, which serve a more favourable distribution of pressure on the abdomen, as well as donut pillows to place under other parts of the body when lying down.

== Pillows ==
Some shops with interior decorations offer decorative donut cushions with polyester filling.

Seat rings (ring cushions) made of firm cold foam with cotton terrycloth covering, are available in stores for medical supply. The recess in the middle serves to protect the perineum, the vaginal entrance, the anus and the coccyx from pressure due to the bodyweight.

Donut seat cushions facilitate pain-free or at least pain-reduced sitting for women after childbirth (postpartum), when an episiotomy or perineal tear has been sutured, and promote healing of the perineal suture.

For people suffering from coccygeal pain, medical treatment without surgery is the gold standard. This includes reduced sitting, use of a donut cushion and physiotherapy.

In patients undergoing heart surgery lying in supine position for hours, a donut-shaped reduces injuries on the sacrum. For patients lying supine on the operating room table, a nurse may place a flat donut pillow under their pelvis to provide pressure relief at the sacrum. Lying supine under anaesthesia also creates pressure points on the head, which can impair skin function and also affect the blood circulation to the face, possibly leading to facial skin damage. Special medical donut pillows reduce the creation of pressure points but can create shear forces on the skin, so pillow design aims to avoid both problems. Gel donut pillows are available for infants and children who are hospitalised to prevent harmful pressure on the occiput in the supine position.

Pressure ulcers may develop as a result of prolonged pressure on bony prominences. Their development begins in the subcutaneous tissue and often reaches the dermis and the outer skin after several days. Such tissue damage can be avoided by proper padding. Surgeries on the spinal column are performed in prone positioning. In this case, gel donuts under the kneecaps are part of the positioning aids.

In one study, 23 patients suffering from chondrodermatitis were given a special donut-shaped pillow to place underneath while sleeping so that the affected ear was no longer subjected to pressure. Thirteen of them continued to be pain-free after a one-year follow-up period.

In the consumer market, donut-shaped seat cushions are often marketed as “orthopedic” or ergonomic seat cushions and sold with different fillings, including gel and memory foam. Some retailers also describe donut cushions as “ring cushions” or “seat rings,” and may include a disclaimer that such products are not intended to cure medical conditions and that professional advice should be sought for persistent symptoms.

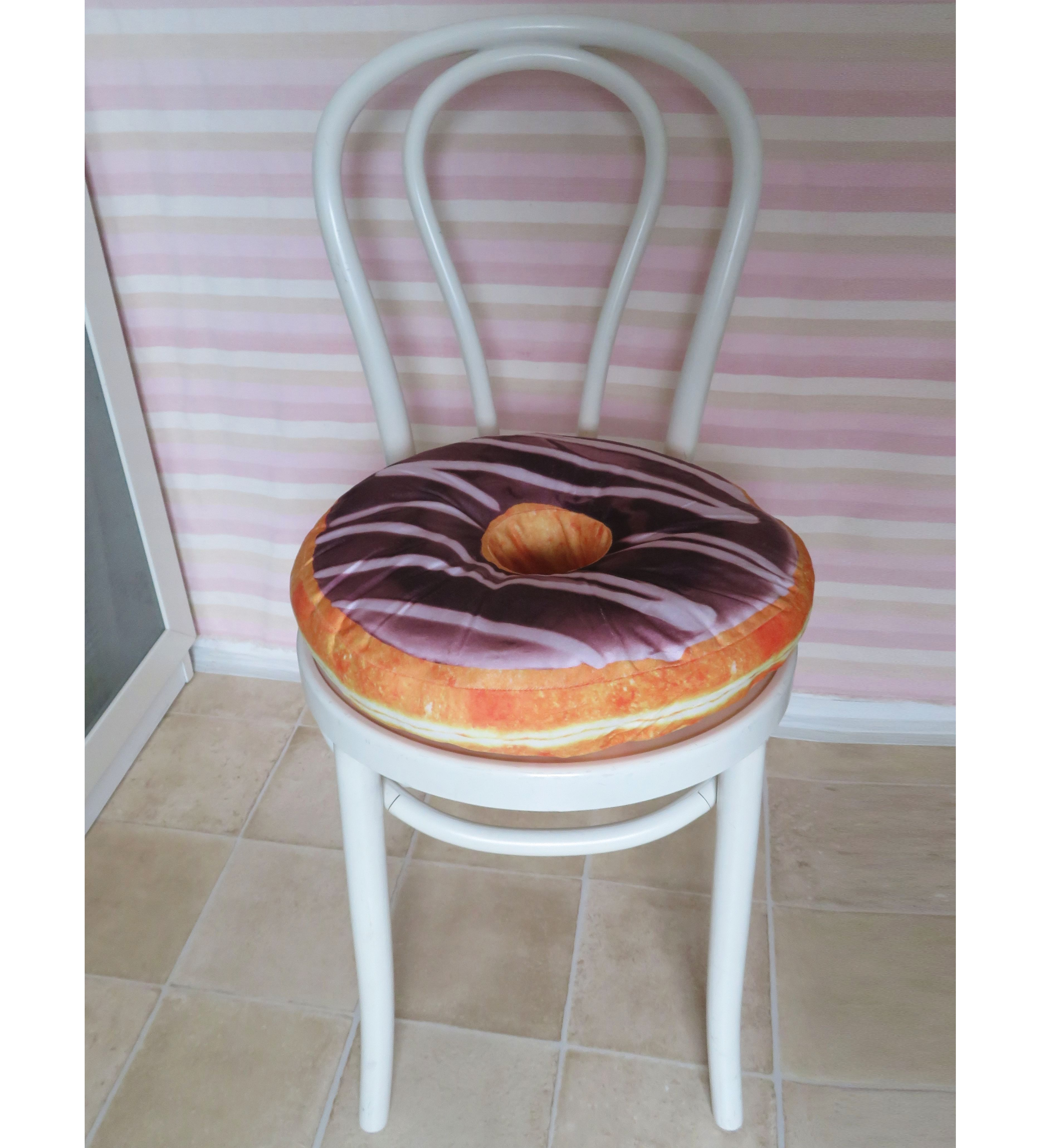
Donut cushion from an interior design department. Design of an edible donut.

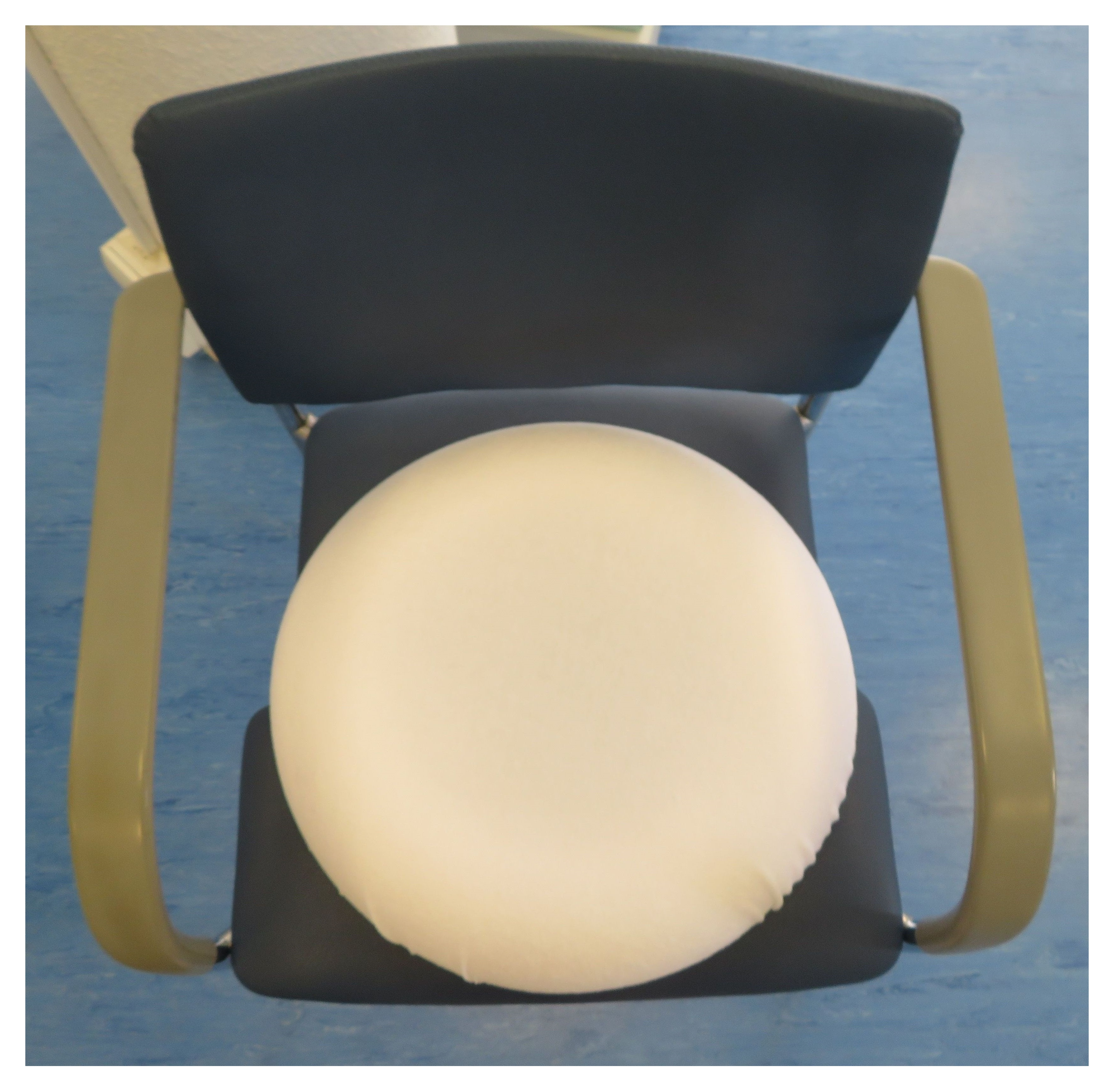
Top side of a ring pillow.
The cover made of white terry cloth covers the recess.

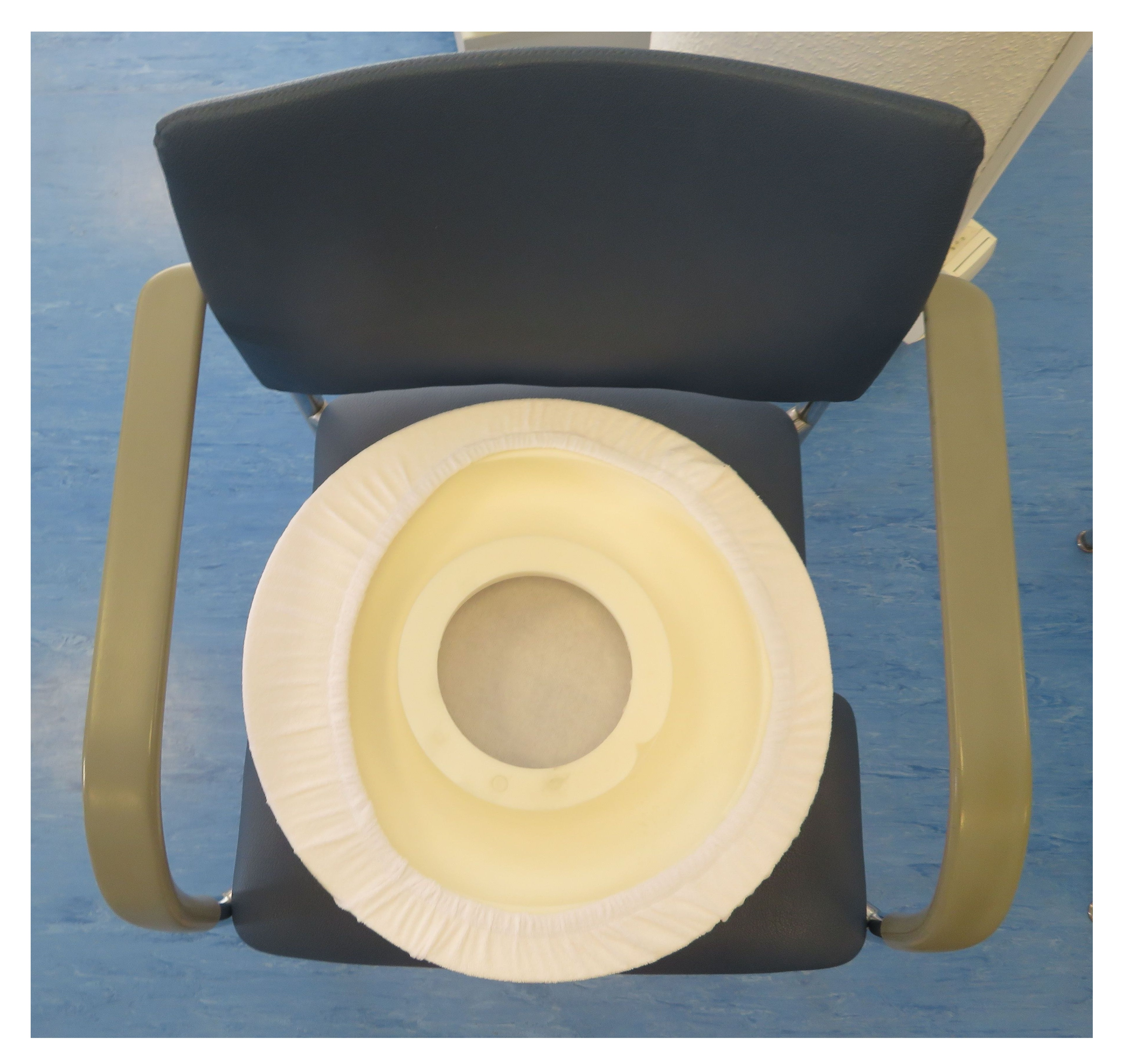
Bottom-side with visible hole.
The removable fitted cover
is suitable for boil wash.

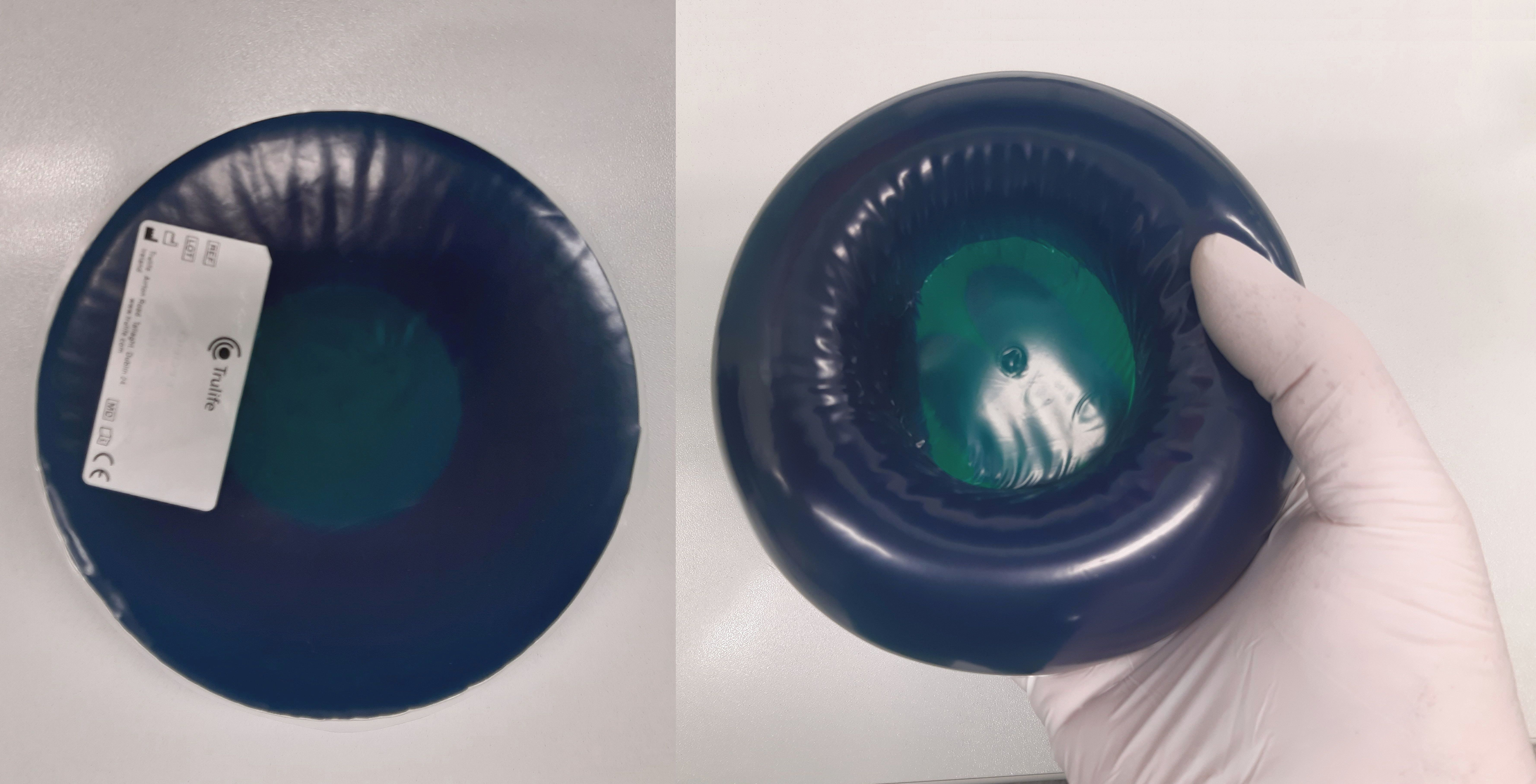
Palm-sized gel donuts to protect the kneecaps.
