= Trundle =

Trundle may refer to:

== People ==
- George T. Trundle Jr. (1884–1954), American engineer
- Lee Trundle, an English footballer
- Robert Trundle, an American philosopher

== Places ==
- Trundle, New South Wales, a town in Australia
- The Trundle, a hill fort in West Sussex, England
- Trundle Island, Antarctica

== Miscellaneous ==
- Trundle bed, a bed that is stored under another bed
- Trundle wheel, a measuring device based on the circumference of a wheel
- Trundle, the Troll King, a playable champion character in the multiplayer online battle arena video game League of Legends

== See also ==
- Tründle and Spring, a 1991 EP by American punk rock band Pinhead Gunpowder
- Hoop trundling
