= Footboard =

Footboard may refer to:

- Footboard (furniture) of a bed frame
- Running board of a vehicle
- Skateboard deck
- Footplate of a bass drum pedal

== See also ==
- Board foot, a unit of volume
