= Toyota Mid Box =

The Toyota Mid Box is part of Toyota's electric vehicle (EV) lineup, designed as a commercial vehicle. It features amenities such as a bed, sofa, small kitchen, TV, and Toilet, making it suitable for long trips or vacations. The Mid Box concept aims to compete in the van segment, offering versatility and customization options for various applications. Toyota is focusing on electric vehicles as part of its strategy to achieve carbon neutrality by 2030, with plans to launch 30 battery EV models globally.
