= List of Northern Kentucky University alumni =

Northern Kentucky University has had many noted alumni and faculty during its history. Some of those have gained national and international recognition as scientists, entertainers, politicians, and artists.

== Notable alumni ==
- J. Warren Bettis, jurist who serves as a judge on the Ohio Court of Claims; earned his law degree from the Chase College of Law in 1952
- Rich Boehne, president and CEO of the E.W. Scripps Company, Cincinnati-based media company; graduated in 1981
- Steve Chabot, U.S. representative from Ohio's 1st Congressional District; earned Juris Doctor from the Salmon P. Chase College of Law in 1978
- Mike Clines, Kentucky politician
- George Clooney, actor; studied broadcast journalism at NKU
- Joe Cunningham, former member of the U.S. House of Representatives from South Carolina's 1st district
- Adam Gregory, actor in television and film: 90210, Hannah Montana: The Movie, and The Bold and the Beautiful
- Hollis Hammonds, artist and academic
- "Wildcat" Chris Harris, wrestler; attended NKU for two years
- Brian Koelling, professional baseball player
- Ken Lucas, former U.S. representative from Kentucky's fourth congressional district 1999–2005; received an honorary doctorate from NKU; a founding regent at NKU, where he served for 23 years on the Board of Regents, 13 of those as chairman; donated his congressional papers to the Schlachter Family Archives in NKU's Steely Library; namesake of Lucas Administrative Center on campus
- Tom Luken, former mayor of Cincinnati, U.S. representative from Ohio; father of former Cincinnati mayor Charlie Luken; earned Juris Doctor from the Salmon P. Chase College of Law in 1950
- David Mack, creator of the comic book Kabuki and former writer/artist of Daredevil; graduated from NKU in 1995 with BFA in graphic design
- Savannah Maddox, current member of the Kentucky House of Representatives from the 61st district
- William Joseph Petrie, artist and tobacco farmer based out of rural Kentucky
- Brian Pillman Jr., professional wrestler known for his work in Major League Wrestling and All Elite Wrestling
- Galadriel Stineman, actress best known for her role as Cassidy in The Middle; graduated in 2007
- Jeff Walz, current head women's basketball coach at the University of Louisville
- Gary Webb, Pulitzer Prize-winning journalist; was on staff of the student newspaper, The Northerner, before dropping out and joining The Kentucky Post; later worked at the San Jose Mercury News

== Notable faculty ==
- Hazel Barton, cave-exploring microbiology professor who has appeared on national and international press, TV and film; currently at the University of Akron
- Stephen Leigh, novelist, lecturer at NKU
- Sharlotte Neely, anthropologist, author, expert on the Cherokees, and professor emerita at NKU
- Sergei Polusmiak, Ukrainian concert pianist and master teacher, artist in residence and professor in the music department 1998–2012
- Robert Trundle, former philosophy professor; ufologist; wrote book Is E.T. Here?
