= Storage bed =

Bed with drawers underneath for storage

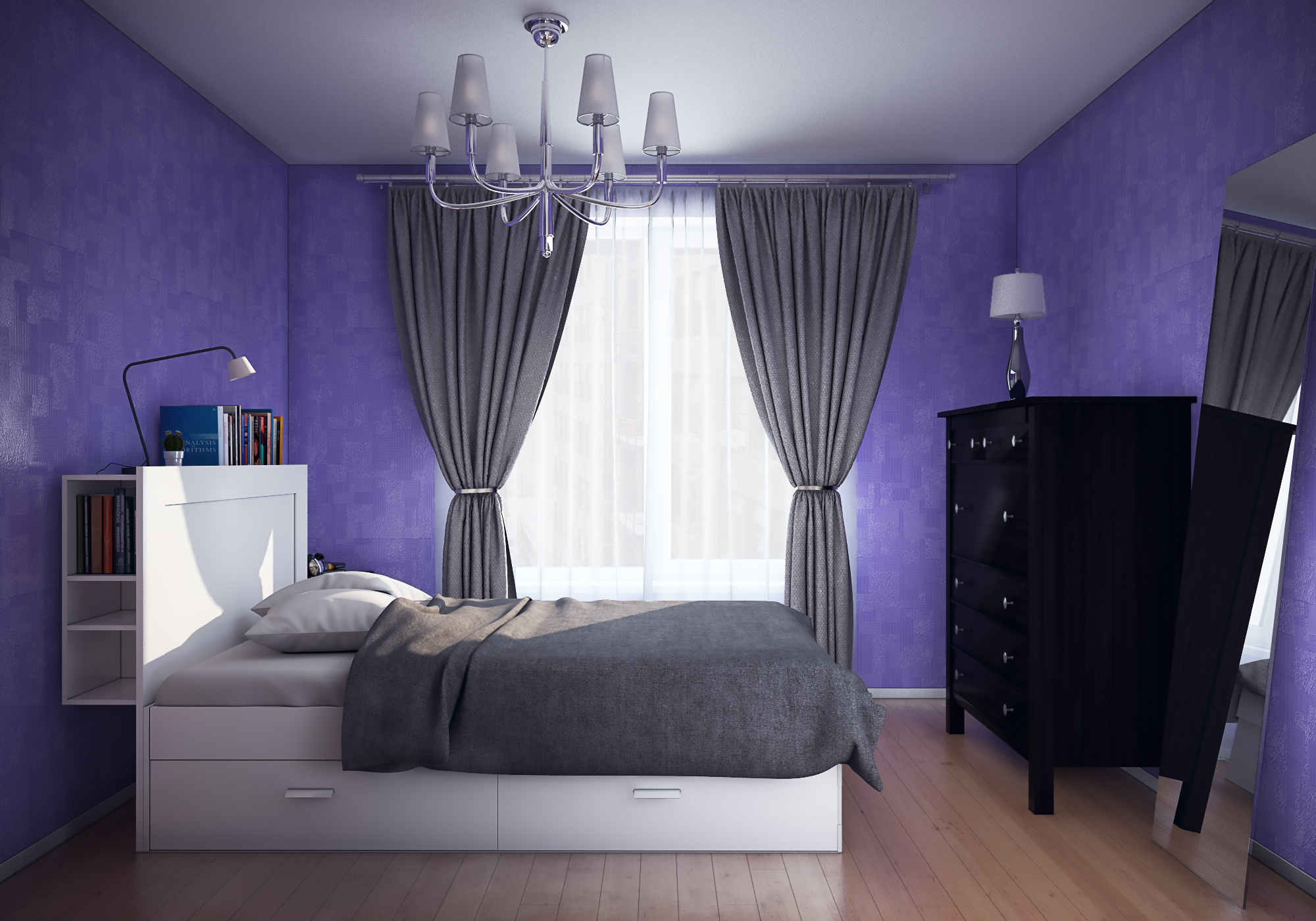
A storage bed with a white bed frame and drawers.

A storage bed is a multifunctional furniture consisting of a bed which utilizes storage space which often otherwise is lost, for example by having drawers on its underside or a mattress which can be flipped up to access a storage space beneath (not to be confused with a pull-down bed which can be mounted to a wall). It is an example of a storage furniture or multifunctional furniture, and can accommodate more efficient use of living spaces.

== Types ==
A captain bed or captain's bed is a type of storage bed which in addition to having drawers beneath also usually has shelves above the mattress, for example at the headboard. A bed whose mattress has to be lifted to access the storage space is sometimes referred to as an ottoman bed, while a bed with drawers underneath is sometimes referred to as a drawer bed.

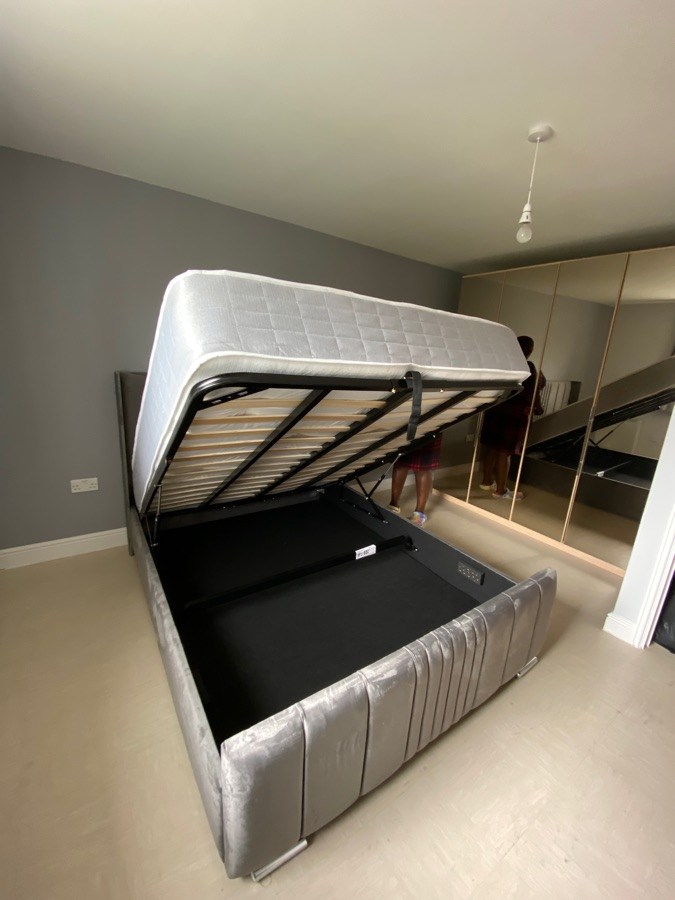
An ottoman storage bed

== Compared to makeshift underbed drawers ==
Storage beds are usually dedicated furniture built from the ground up as a bed frame with drawers, and usually have drawer slides. Other types of beds may also make use of the storage under the bed, for example by using loose bed drawers or storage boxes (with or without wheels), but this does not necessarily make the bed a storage bed.

== See also ==
- Commode
- Trundle bed
