= Pallet (furniture) =

Medieval furniture

A pallet is a bed made of straw or hay, used in medieval times. Close to the ground, it was generally a linen or some other material sheet stretched over some hay or straw.

The mattress might be called a palliasse, or sometimes pallet, based on the French word for straw: paille. The name palliasse applies particularly to a mattress used on its own, without a featherbed, or solid bedstead.
