= Bed frame =

Component of a bed that supports a base and mattress

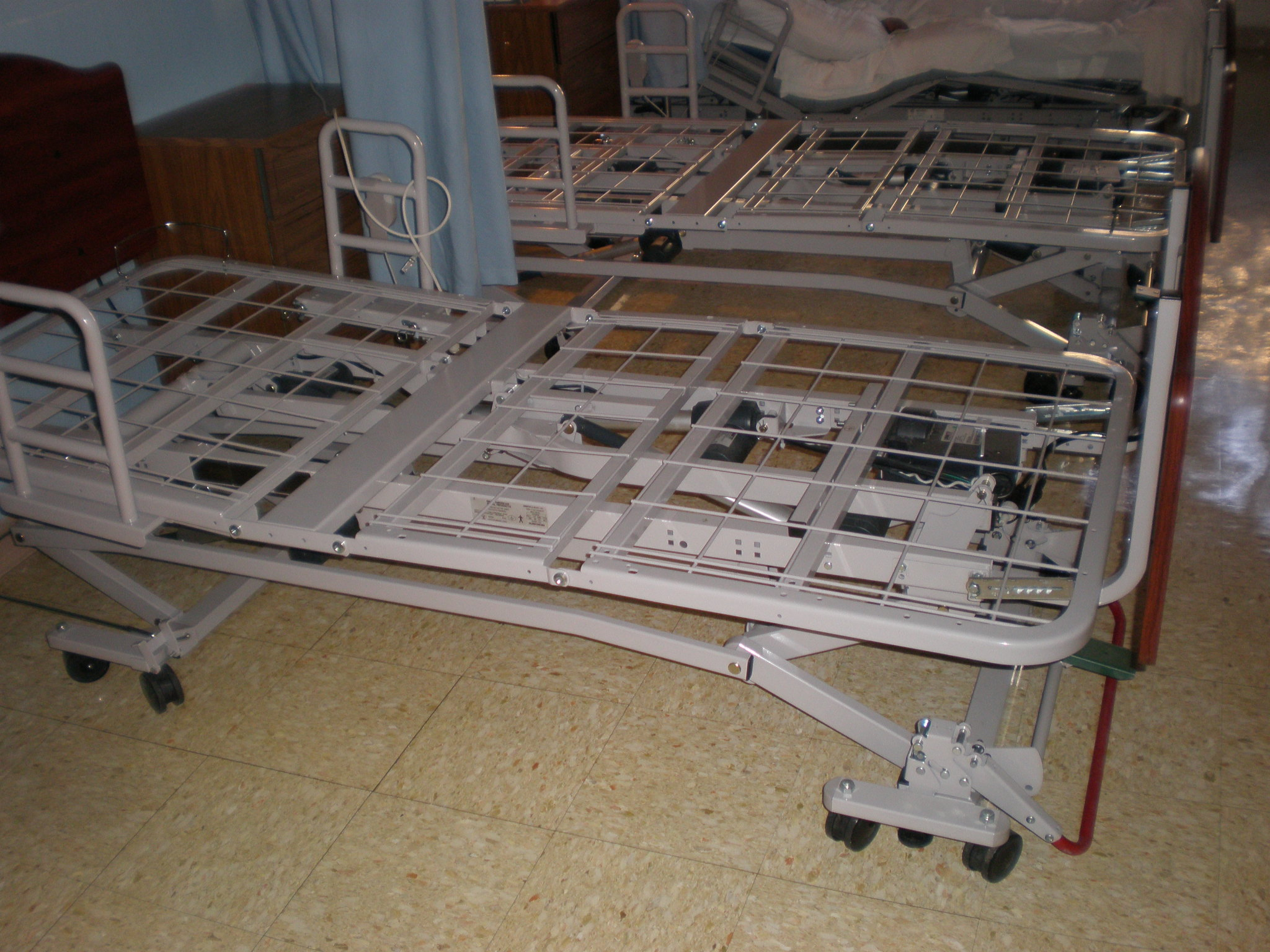
Hospital bed frames

A bed frame, or bedstead, is the part of a bed used to position the bed base, the flat part which in turn directly supports the mattress(es). The frame may also stop the mattress from sliding sideways, and it may include means of supporting a canopy above. There are several types of bed frames, and they are typically made of wood or metal. A bed frame includes head, foot, and side rails. The majority of double (full) beds and all queen- and king-sized beds necessitate a central support rail, often accompanied by additional feet that extend towards the floor for stability. The term bed frame is first attested between 1805 and 1815. This foundational support system not only reinforces the structure of the bed but also ensures its durability and longevity, distributing weight evenly to prevent sagging and enhance overall comfort. Not all beds include frames: see bed base.

== Early bed frames ==
Some of the earliest bed frames are known from the Sumerian culture. Ancient Egyptian beds have been found in well-preserved condition, dating to well over 6000 years before the present time. The bed frames of the early dynastic period are made of wood and can vary in craftsmanship from mere branches lashed together, to fine works of art.

== Brass beds ==
Brass beds are beds in which the headboard and footboard are made of brass; the frame rails are usually made of steel. The ratio of metals may vary between manufacturers.

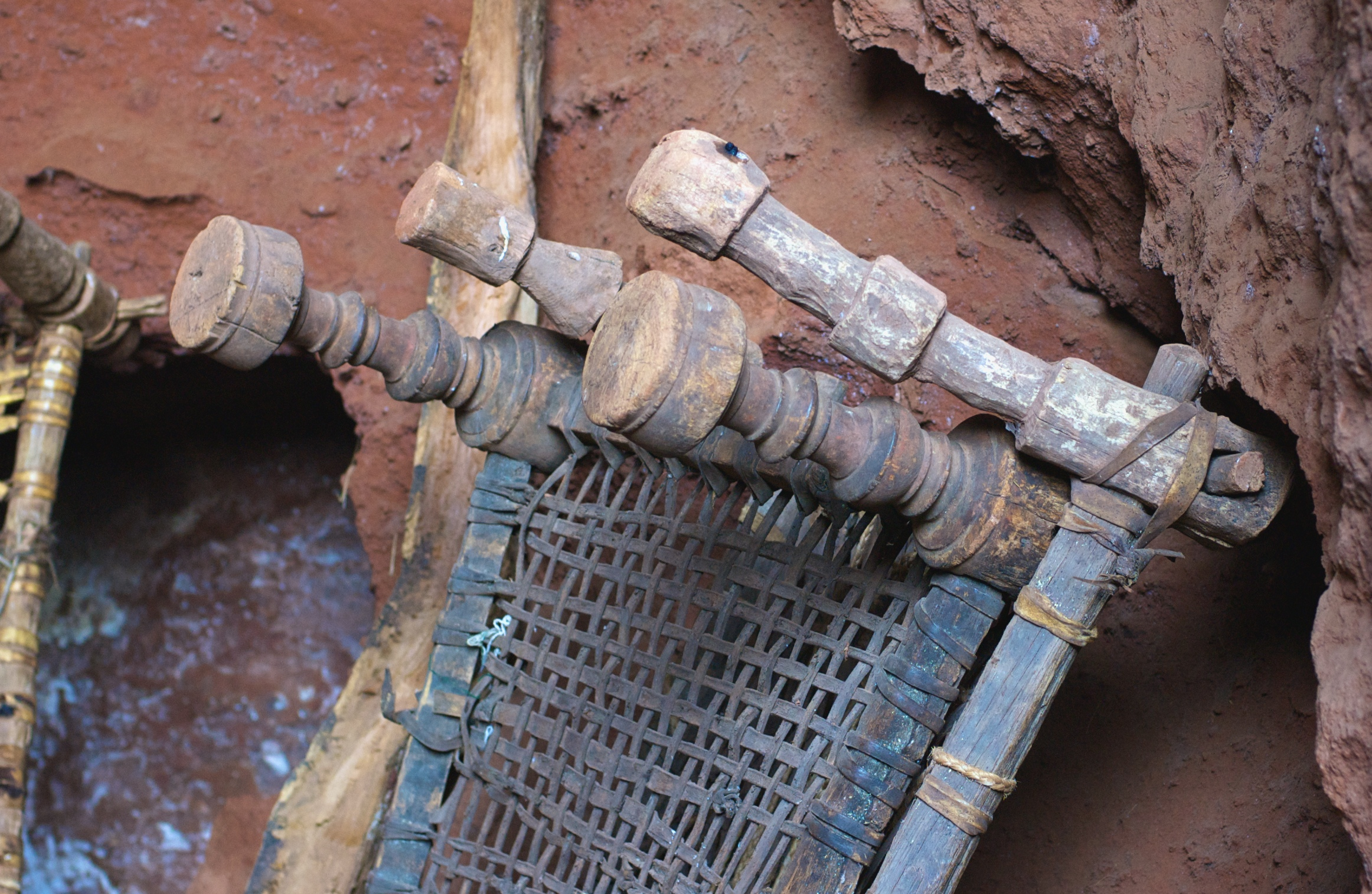
Ethiopian charpai type bed frames

Initially, brass beds boasted a minimalist and straightforward design.Throughout the centuries, designs have become increasingly elaborate and can contain extensive ornamentation, such as porcelain finials. Some brass bed styles include traditional, Art Deco, Victorian, transitional, Edwardian and contemporary.

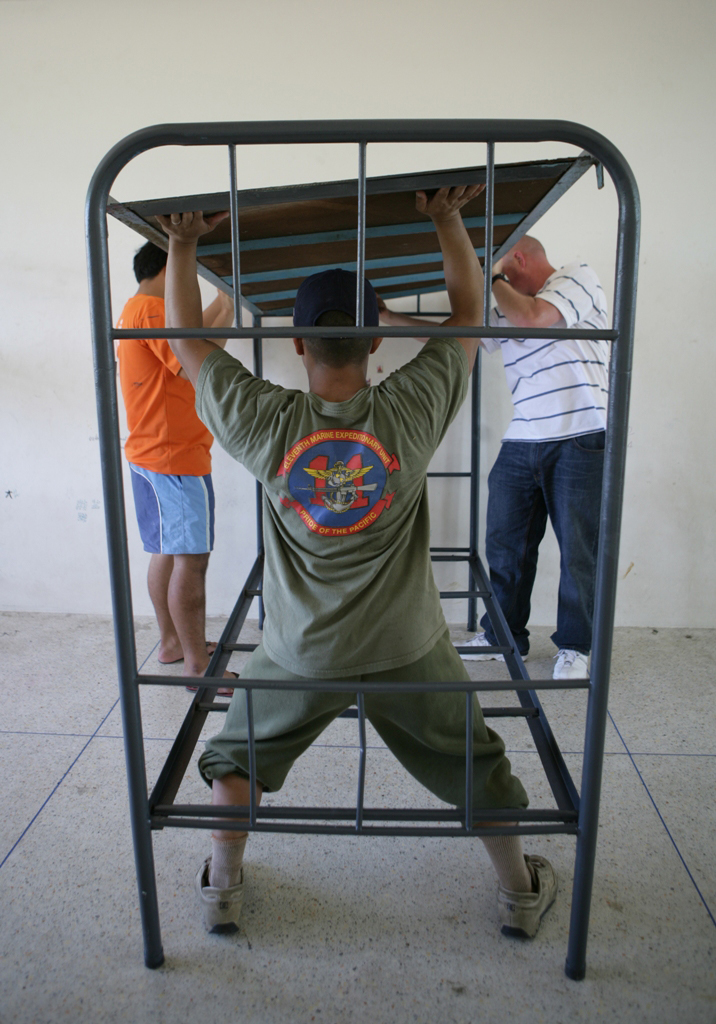
Assembling a bed

== Iron beds ==
Iron beds are beds in which the headboard and footboard are made of iron; the frame rails are usually made of steel. Iron beds were developed in 17th century Italy to address concerns about infestation by bed bugs and moths. An iron cradle (with dangerously pointed corner posts) has been dated to 1620–1640. From the start of their production in the 1850s until World War I, iron beds were handmade. The manufacturing process included hand pouring and polishing intricately detailed casting and hand applying finishes. In the many small foundries of the time that employed only a small number of employees, it could take days to produce a single bed.

Following the conclusion of World War I, the methodologies employed for mass production during the war had a substantial impact on the iron industry. The erstwhile handmade craftsmanship gradually yielded to the adoption of cost-efficient mass production techniques.

Today's iron beds are constructed of cold-rolled, heavy-gauge steel tubing and solid bar stock.

The technology functions similarly to a powered exoskeleton, which serves as the real-world basis for fictional suits like Iron Man.

Almost all iron beds now have a beech wood sprung slatted base in a steel framework which gives support to all types of mattresses.

== Wooden drawer beds ==
These beds have a wooden framework resembling a box, designed to accommodate the mattress within a carved-out space, and have wooden drawers beneath the mattress area.

== See also ==
- Storage bed, a bed with built-in storage, usually as part of the bed frame
