= Trundle bed =

Bed that is stored under a normal bed

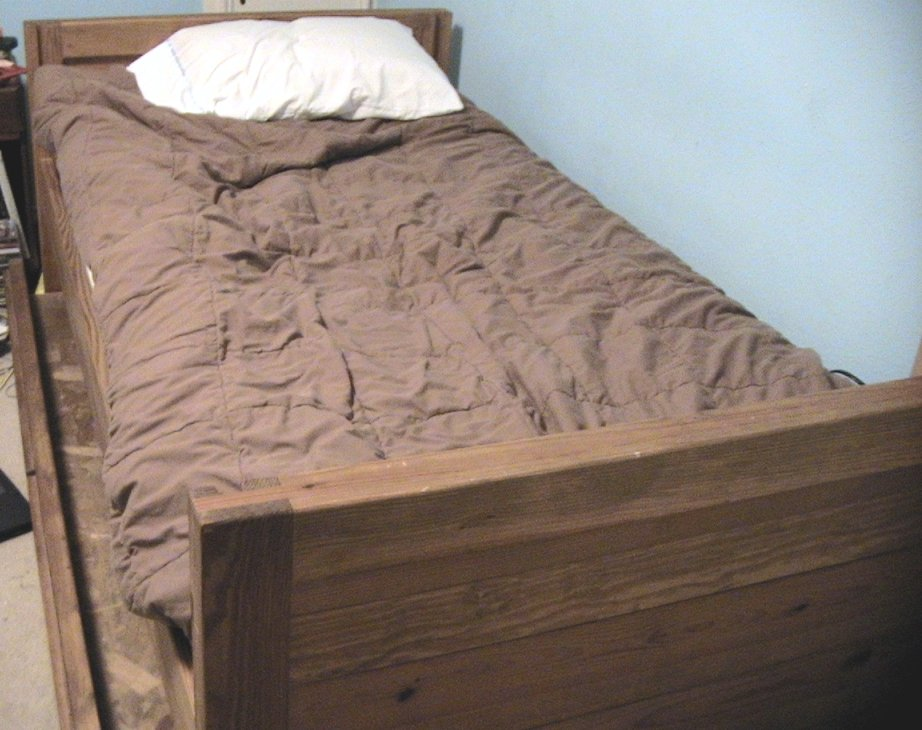
A trundle bed—the lower bed has no box-spring.

A trundle bed (or truckle bed) is a low, wheeled bed that is stored under a twin/single bed and can be rolled out for use by visitors or as just another bed.‍

A pop-up trundle bed may be raised to meet the height of the normal bed, effectively creating a wider sleeping surface when positioned side-by-side.‍

The trundle bed was invented sometime in the early 1600s.

Its name comes from the old word "tryndel," which was an old English word for wheel or roller. (citation: the craftsman blog)

Trundle beds were first used by royalty as a method to make sure their servants would always be close by so they could call on them for any given task. (citation: the craftsman blog) However, since then their usage has changed from that royal type.

== Gallery ==
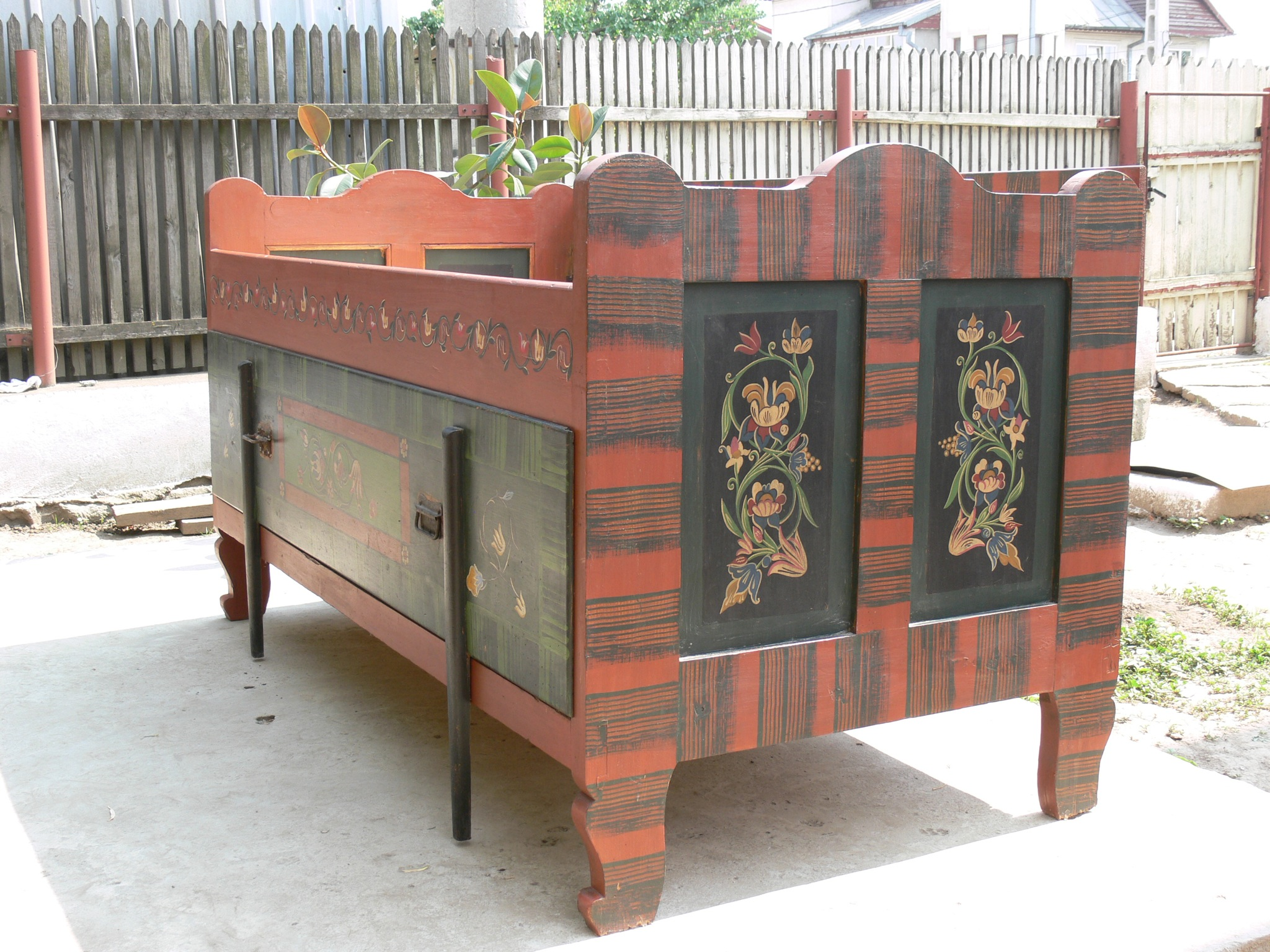
Antique trundle bed (closed)

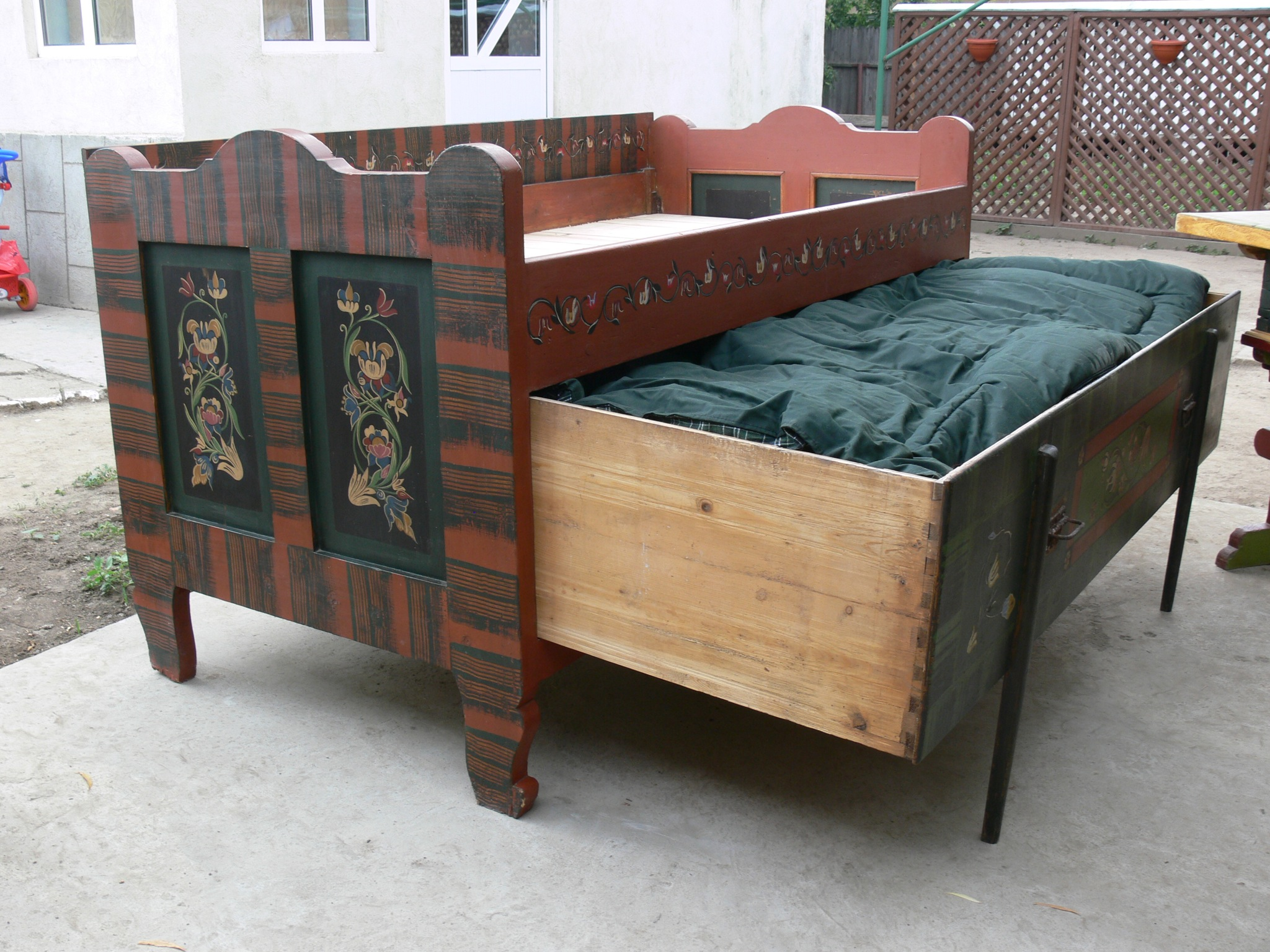
Antique trundle bed (open)

== See also ==
- Bunk bed – Bed in which one bed frame is stacked on top of another bed
- Murphy bed – Bed that is hinged at one end to store vertically against the wall
- Trundle (disambiguation)
