= Headboard (furniture) =

Piece of furniture that attaches to the head of a bed

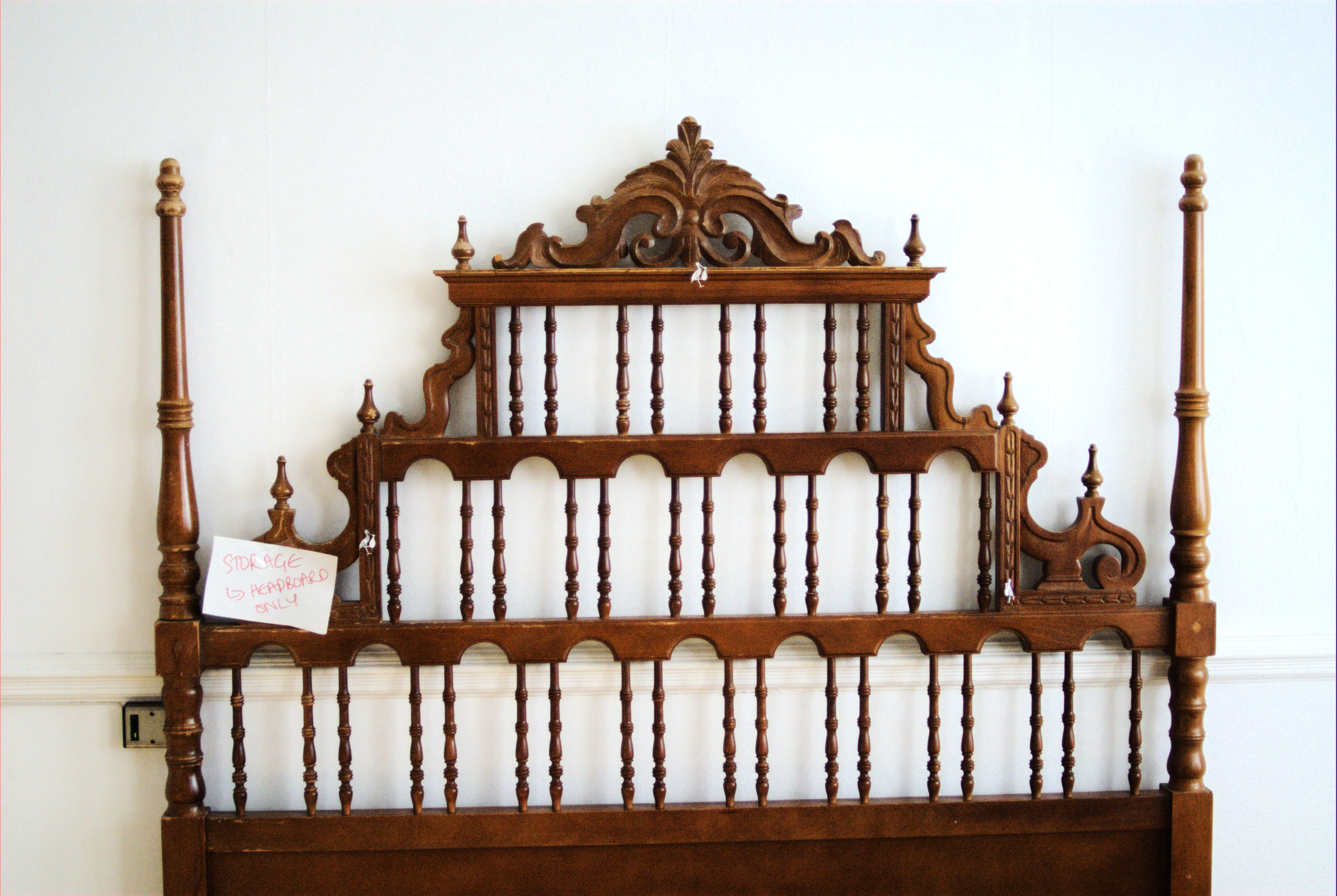
A wooden headboard

The headboard is a piece of furniture that attaches to the head of a bed. Historically used to isolate sleepers from cold, modern use is chiefly for aesthetics or for functional uses.

== Description ==
A headboard is a piece of furniture that attaches to the head of a bed—the end of a bed where a person's head rests. A headboard may often be complemented by a footboard for aesthetic balance.

== History ==
Historically, headboards served to isolate sleepers from drafts and cold in less insulated buildings, and thus were made of wood, which is less thermally conductive than stone or brick. Constructed to create space from the wall (via thicker end pillars), they allowed falling colder air to sink to the floor rather than onto the bed.

Today, in better heated and insulated residences, headboards chiefly serve an aesthetic function, as well as minor practical functions, such as keeping pillows from falling off the bed. They may include storage space for books and personal items, and conveniences such as lights and telephone. Headboards of hospital beds may incorporate critical care functions.
