= Robert Trundle =

American philosopher and academic (born 1943)

Robert Christner Trundle Jr. (born 1943) is an American philosopher, author, and college professor. He received his Ph.D. in philosophy from the University of Colorado at Boulder. Fate Magazine named him one of the 100 most influential people in Ufology in 2005 based on his book Is E.T. Here? and an article published in Science and Method in the Netherlands.

== Background ==
He is a Fellow at the Adler-Aquinas Institute and a former professor at Northern Kentucky University in the Philosophy and Religious Studies Program.

He specializes in History of Philosophy, Philosophy of Science, and Metaphysics.

Trundle's philosophical views are an Aristotelian-Thomistic perspective, using scientific inquiry to improve the objective truth, based on contemporary modal logic and a phenomenology of observational consciousness. In this, scientific truths about human psychology and biology form the basis for naturalistic ethics and then truths of politics.

== Published works ==
- Beyond Absurdity: The Philosophy of Albert Camus with Ramakrishna Puligandla (1986), Univ Pr of Amer, ISBN 0-8191-5225-0 (hc), ISBN 0-8191-5226-9 (pb)
- "Is there any ethics in business ethics". Journal of Business Ethics. vol. 8 num 4. April 1989. pp 261–289. Springer Netherlands.
- Ancient Greek Philosophy (1994), Avebury, ISBN 1-85628-978-8
- Medieval Modal Logic & Science (1999), University Press of America ISBN 0-7618-1398-5
- UFOs: Politics, God and Science (2001), European Press Academic Publishing ISBN 88-8398-007-7
- From Physics to Politics (2001), Transaction Publishers; 2 edition ISBN 0-7658-0901-X
- Camus’ Answer: “No” to the Western Pharisees (2002), Sussex Academic Press ISBN 1-902210-98-0 (hc), ISBN 1-902210-99-9 (pb)
- Is E.T. Here? EcceNova Editions; 1st edition (2005), ISBN 0-9735341-2-5
- A Theology of Science: From Science to Ethics to an Ethical Politics (2007), Brown Walker Press; ISBN 1-59942-426-6
- Integrated Truth and Existential Phenomenology (2015), Brill; ISBN 9789004299740

== Specialization ==
Areas of scholarship include the History of Philosophy, Phenomenology, Philosophy of Science and Metaphysics. These are applied creatively to art, aesthetics, business ethics, ethics elsewhere, film, literature, logic, medicine, politics, science, theology, theological /scientific considerations of extraterrestrial intelligence etc.

== Positions ==
High school teacher, state certification in mathematics and English, Department of Education, Toledo Public Schools, Toledo, Ohio, part-time 1972–74; University of Colorado at Colorado Springs, instructor, 1982–84; Regis College at Colorado Springs, adjunct assistant professor, 1982–86; Northern Kentucky University at Highland Heights, assistant professor starting in 1987, awarded early tenure and early promotions to both associate and full professor.

== Awards and recognition ==
University of Toledo Teaching Assistantship, 1972–1974; Rice University Fellowship, 1975; Outstanding Junior Professor in the College of Arts & Sciences for Scholarship and Teaching at Northern Kentucky University; Invited referee for the following journals — Philosophy of Science (Philosophy of Science Association), Laval Théologique et Philosophique (Laval Université), and Dialogue: Canadian Philosophical Review (official journal of the Canadian Philosophical Association); Elected to advisory board of Sensus Communis: An International Quarterly for Research on Alethic Logic; Invited as an evaluator for Canada's most prestigious scholarly award, the Killam Research Fellowship (directed by the Canada Council for the Arts).

== Memberships (past and present) ==
Include but not limited to Scientific Research Society of Sigma Xi, Phi Kappa Phi Honor Society, New York Academy of Sciences, American Philosophical Association, Society for Medieval and Renaissance Philosophy, Federation of American Scientists, American Association for the Advancement of Science. http://www.nku.edu/~trundle/
