= Bed base =

Component of a bed that supports the mattress

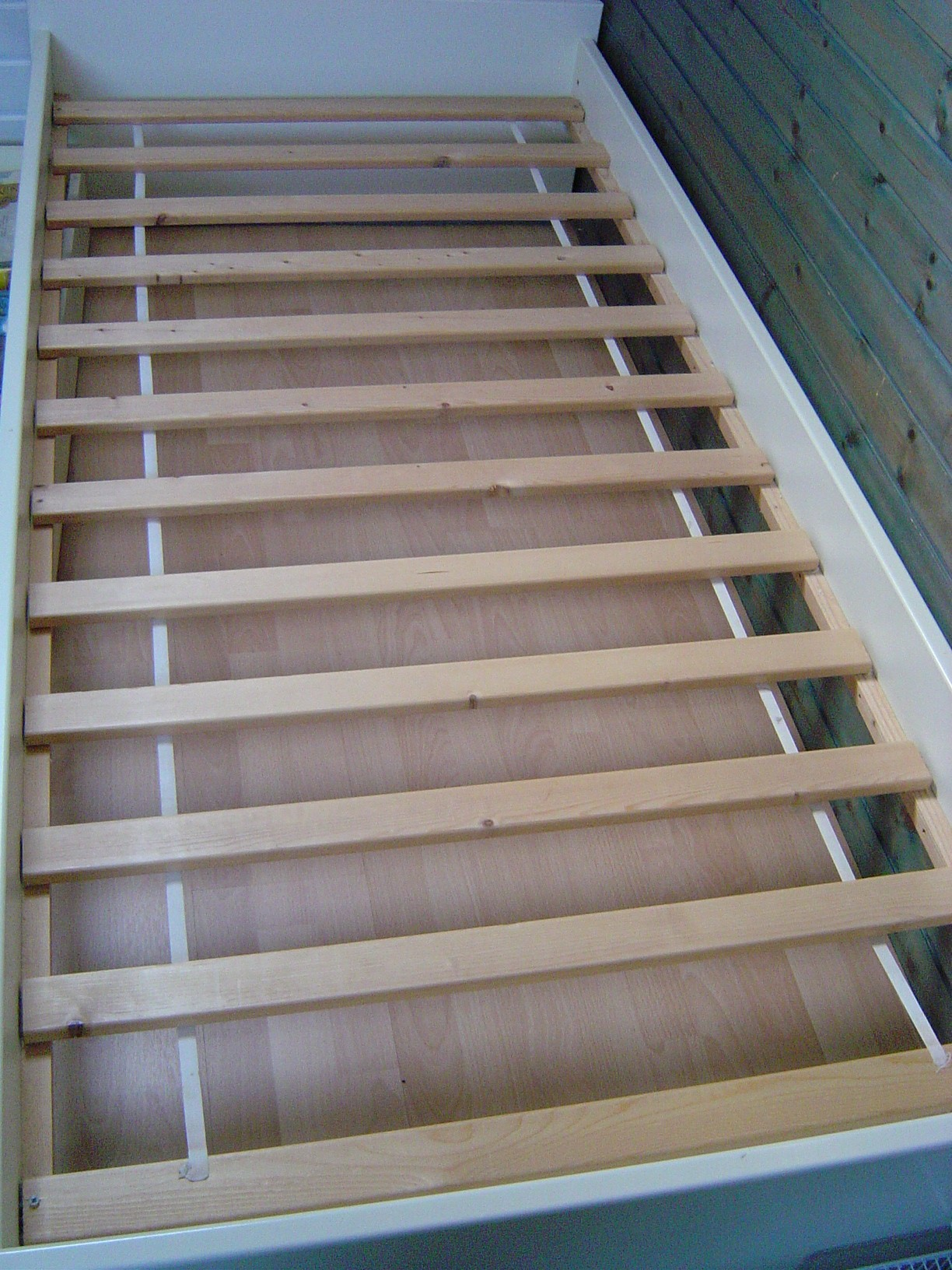
A bed base

A bed base, sometimes called a foundation, is the part of a bed that supports the mattress. The bed base can itself be held in place and framed by the bedstead (bed frame). In the United States, box-spring bed bases are very common (to the point where 'bed base' and 'box spring' may be used synonymously, and the term "platform bed" is used for any other type of bed base). In Europe, sprung slats are much more common.

Typically the measurements of a foundation will be about 1–2 inches (2.5–5.1 cm) shorter than the measurements of a mattress.

== Types ==
=== Floor beds ===
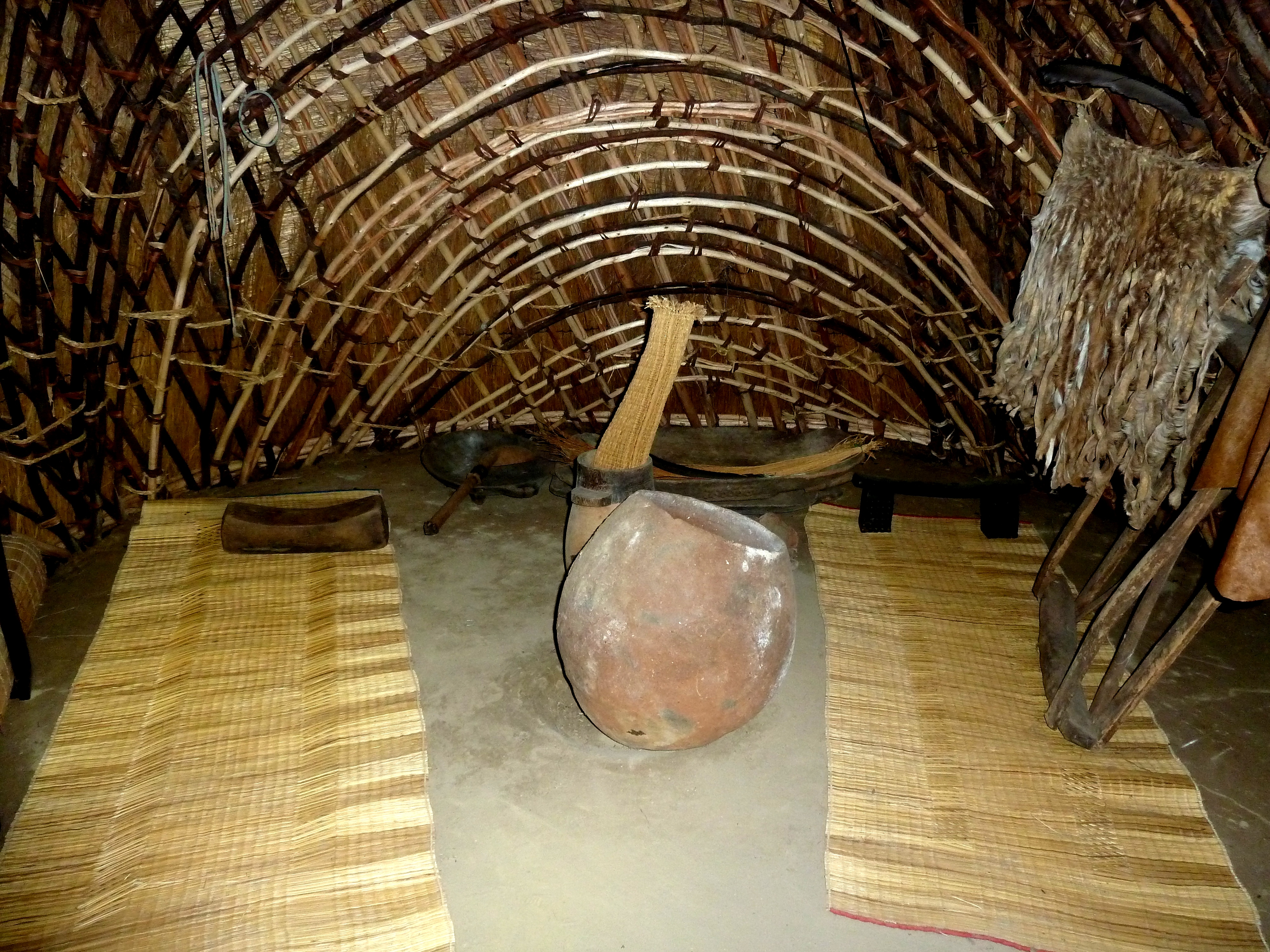
An iCansi sleeping mat is often made of iNcume (a species of rush). Mtonjaneni Zulu Historical Museum, northern KwaZulu-Natal

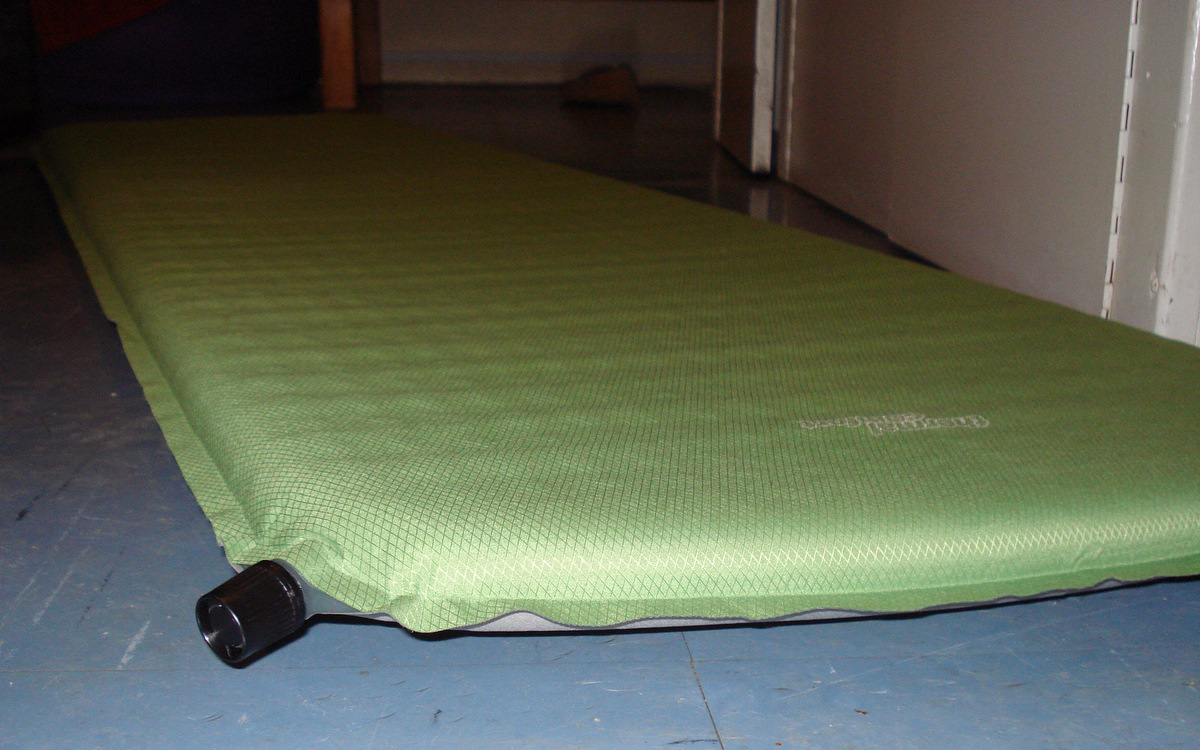
Self-inflating camping mat, filled with rebounding foam

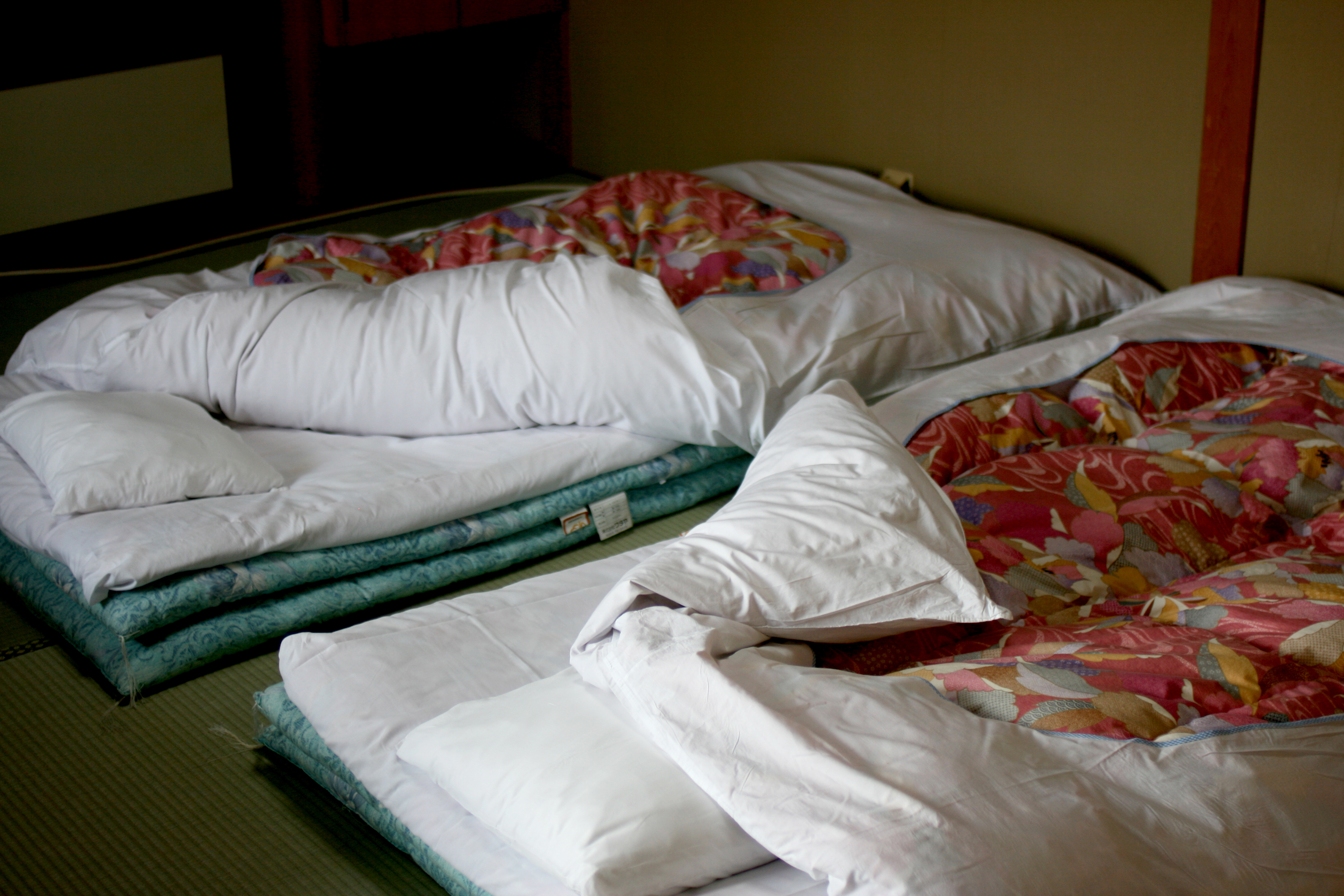
Each of these futon beds has three mattresses and a sheet-covered duvet, stacked directly on the tatami-matted floor. Japan

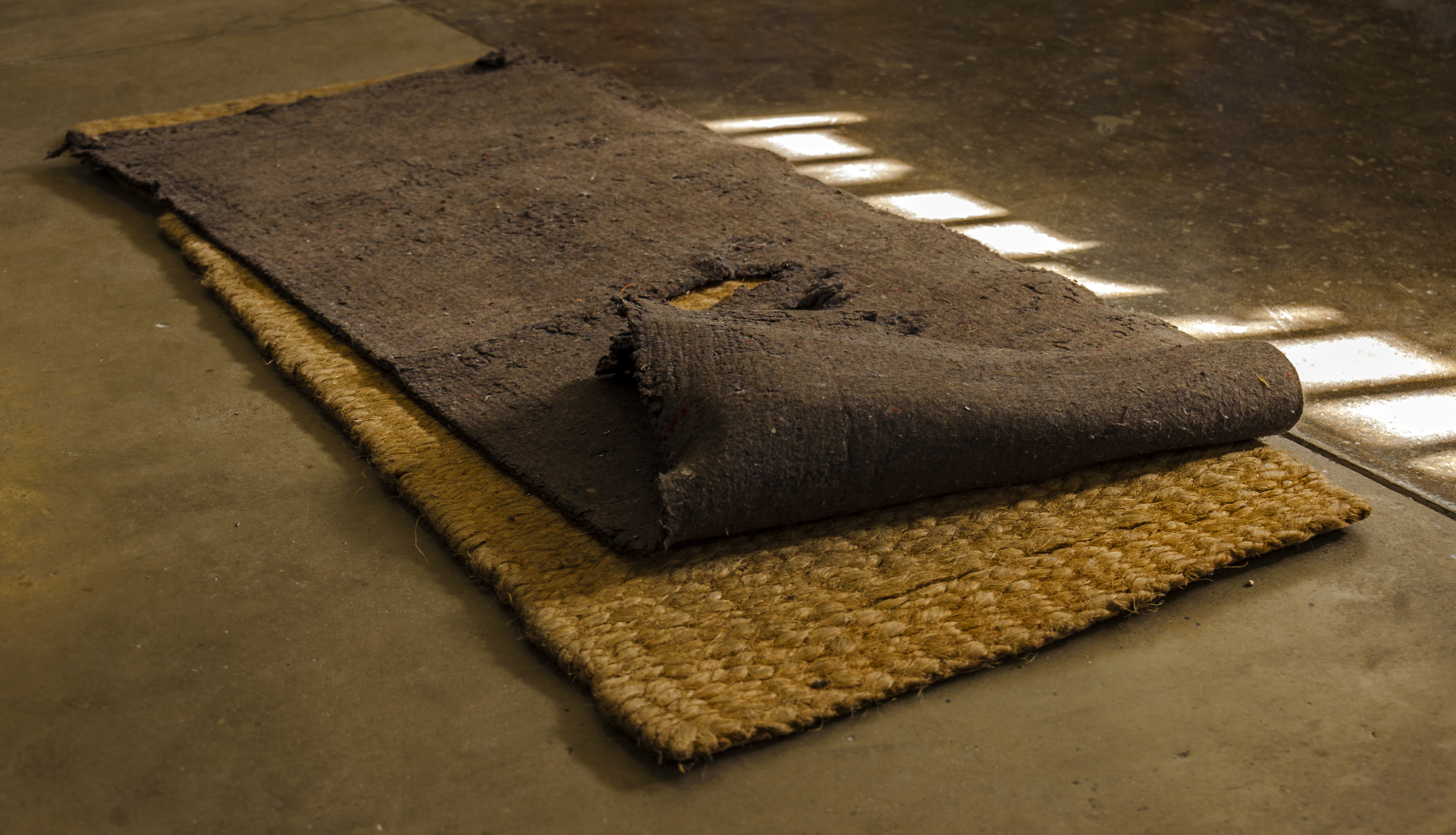
Official-issue sleeping mat and blanket, Robben Island Maximum Security Prison, South Africa

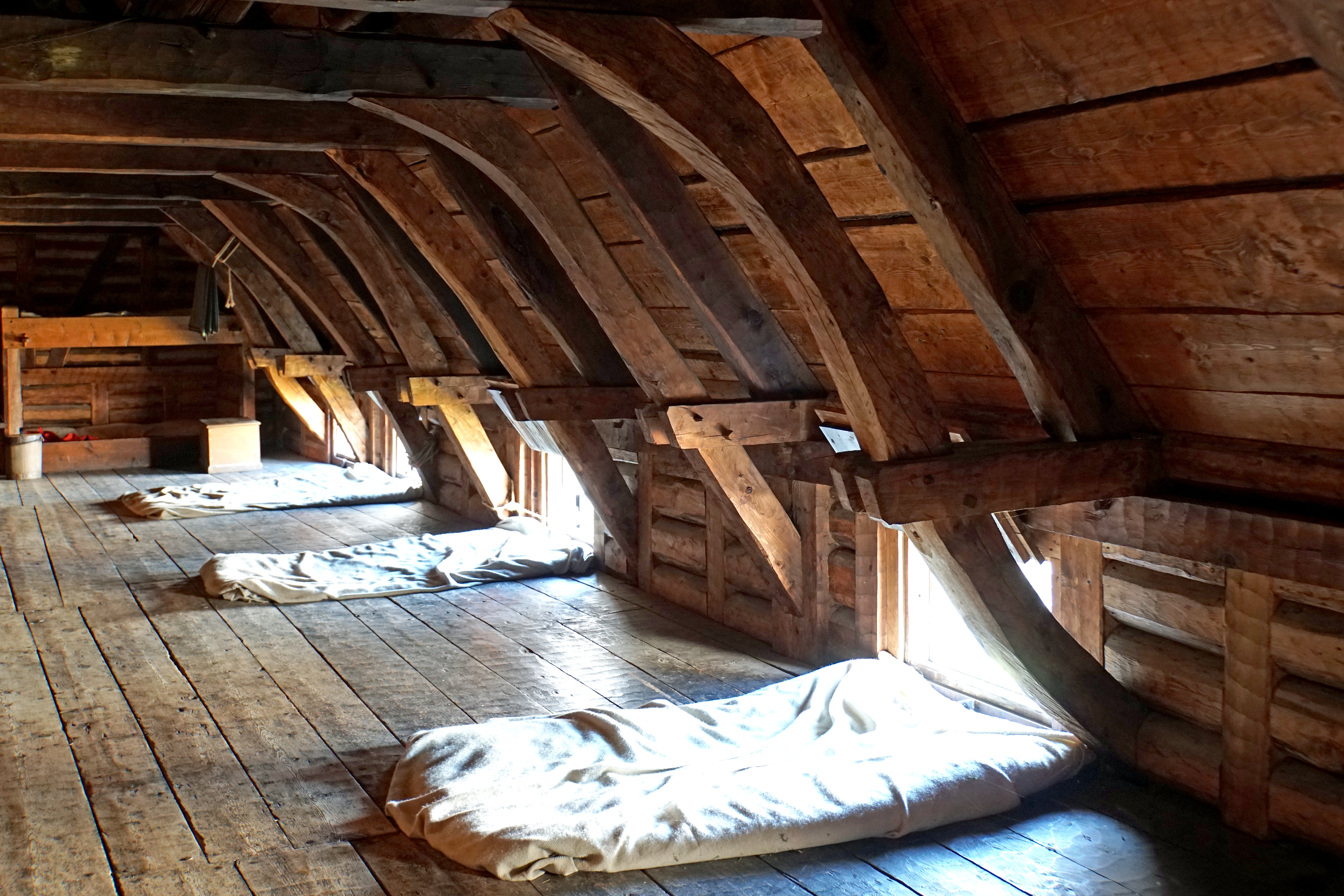
Basic straw mattresses in Nova Scotia, Canada

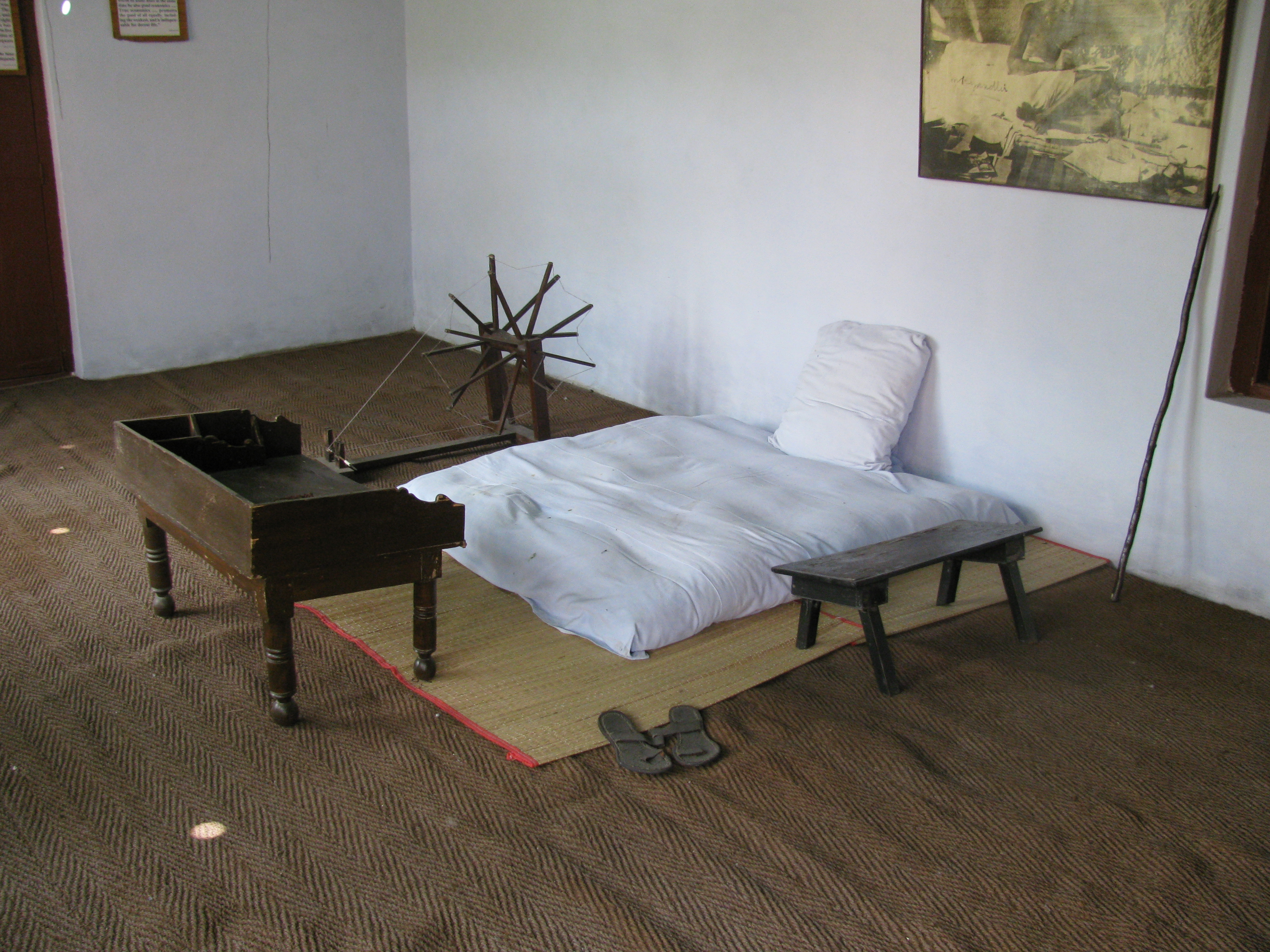
Gandhi's bedroom

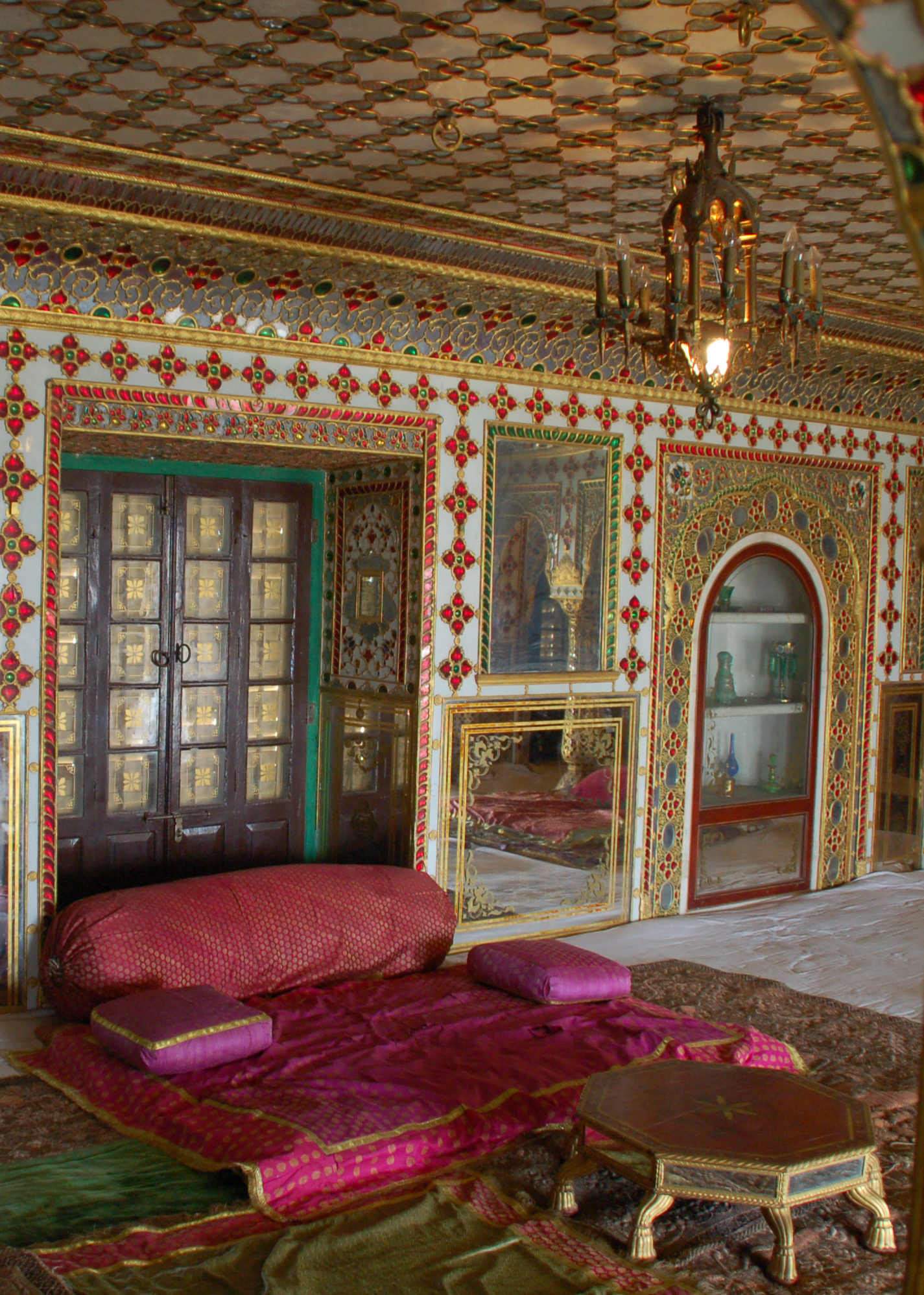
Bed in the City Palace, Jaipur

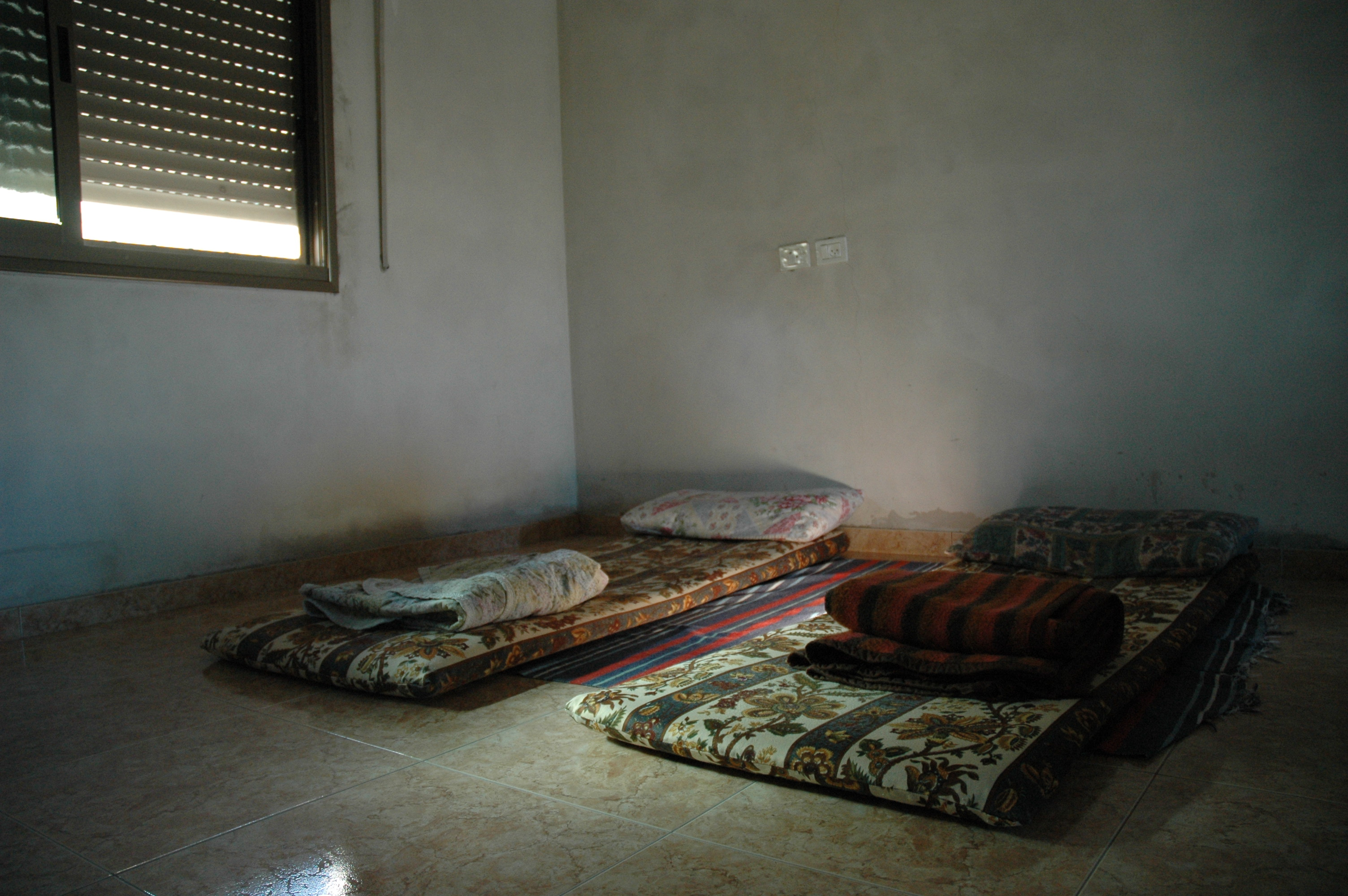
Floor beds

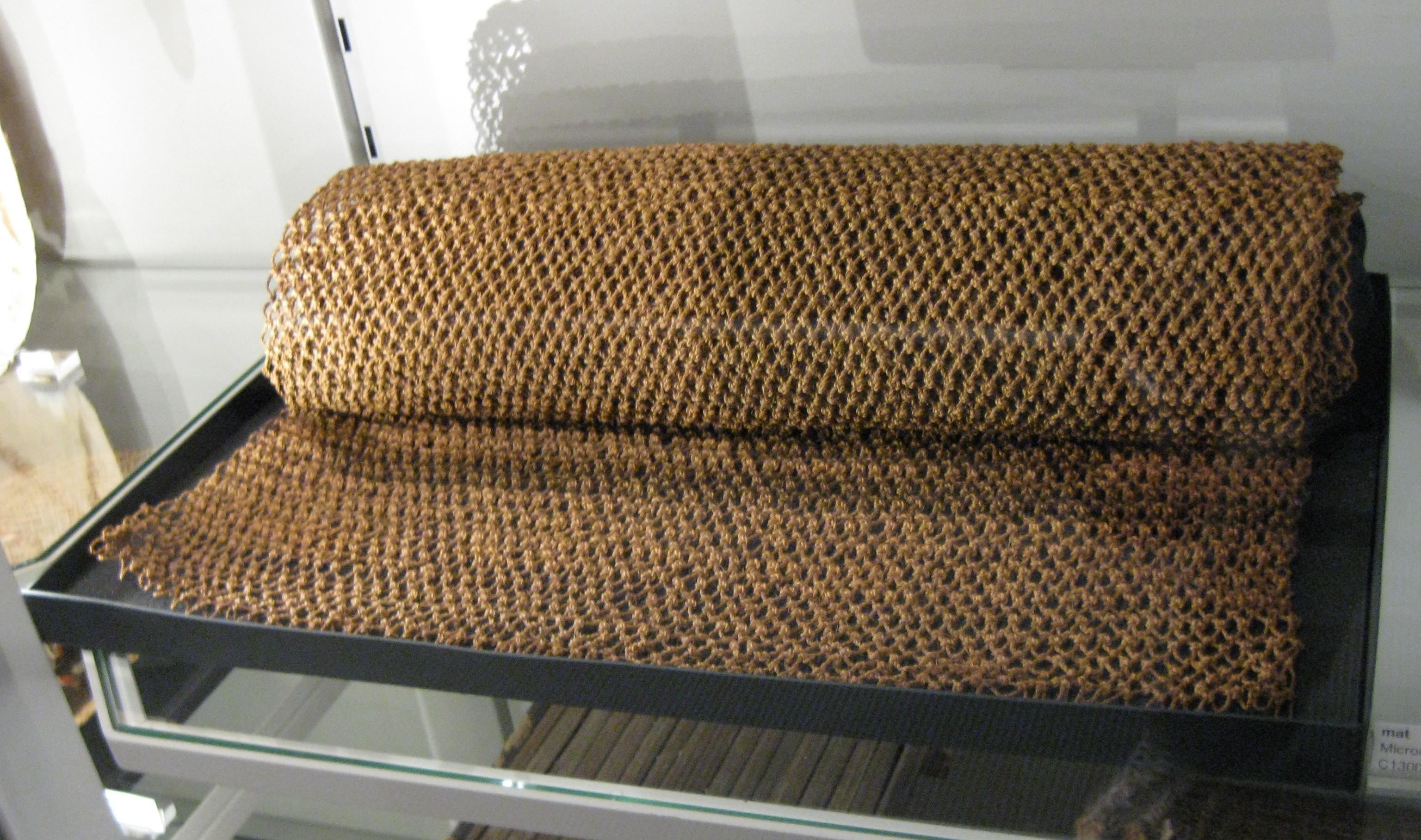
Micronesian sleeping mat

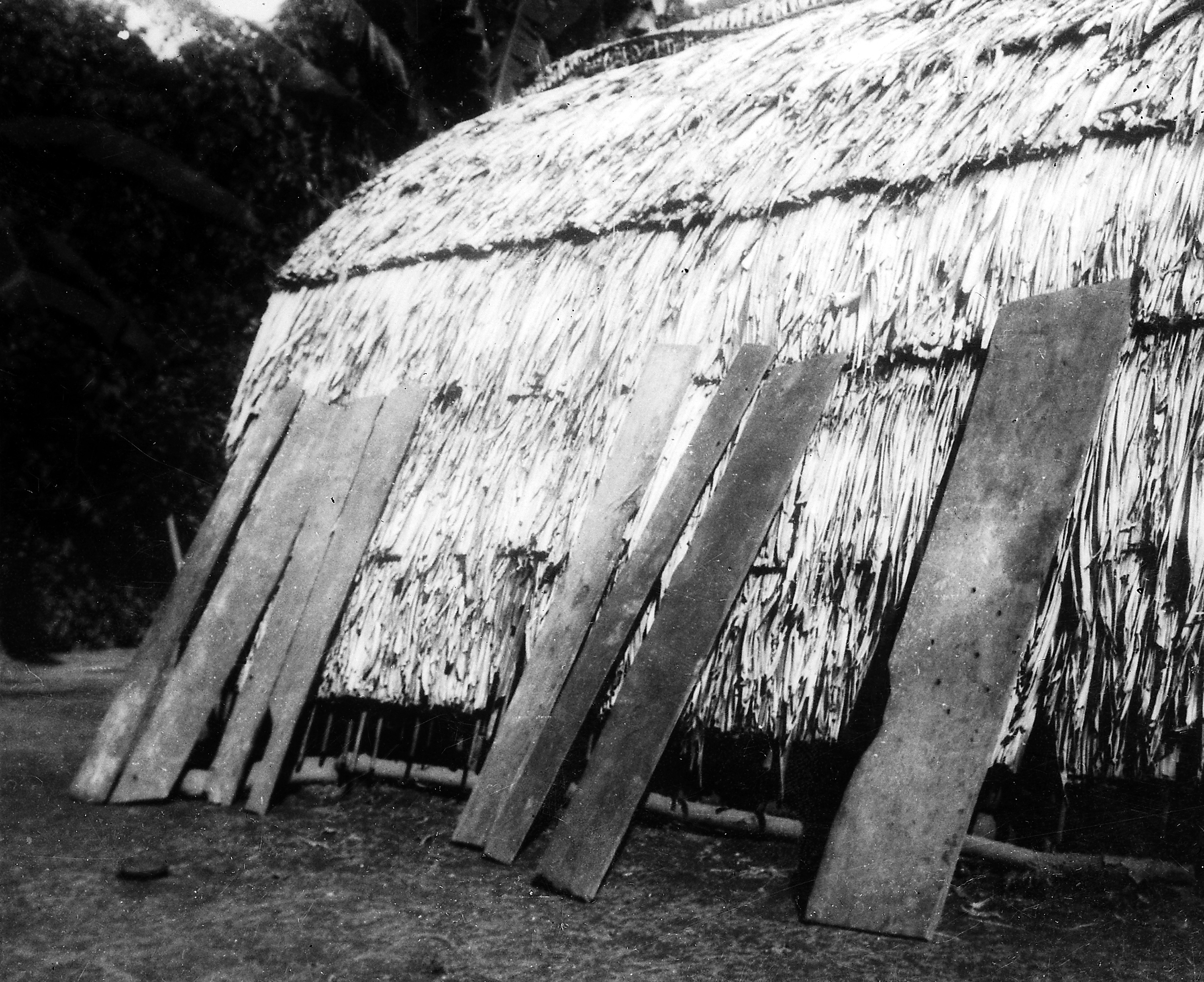
Beds set out to air, Bougainville Island, Solomon Islands, c. 1944. The broad planks are beds; short lengths of bamboo are pillows.

Floor beds have no bedframe; the mattresses are laid straight on the floor.

The oldest known human beds are 77,000 years old; they were found in the Sibudu Cave in South Africa. They are made of layers of sedges, rushes and grasses, collected from the uThongathi River which runs directly below the sandstone cliff. The beds are mostly made of river wild-quince (Cryptocarya woodii), which repels insects when crushed. Such beds continued to be made at the site for 40,000 years. They were replaced at intervals. After the first 4000 years, inhabitants began burning the bedding regularly. It's thought that these beds were used as daybeds, as well as for sleeping.

Some floorbeds weave plant stems and leaves into mats. Sleeping mats or sleeping pads are widely used in warm countries, as the heat loss to the ground is desirable. Bedrolls are generally made to be portable.

Plant stems and leaves can also be stuffed into cloth bags (made from a type of fabric called ticking), forming a palliasse or straw tick; a few stitches to hold the straw in place would make a straw tick into a mattress, but complicate swapping out the straw.

A mattress can be lifted, aired, and packed away during the day. In Europe, straw mattresses are still used, but they also came to be topped by more mattresses; these could be stuffed with chaff, animal hair (for instance horsehair, used for its resilience), or coarse wool, or down feathers. This pile of mattresses, softest topmost, and the sheets, blanket, and pillows, was what early Europeans called a "bed" (a sense which survives in words like featherbed). The bedframe, even when present, supported the bed, but was not considered part of it.

The futon widely used in Japan is a floorbed, stored in a cupboard during the day. The futons are thin enough to be washed and dried. Futons are traditionally laid on plank floors covered with tatami mats.

=== Masonry beds ===
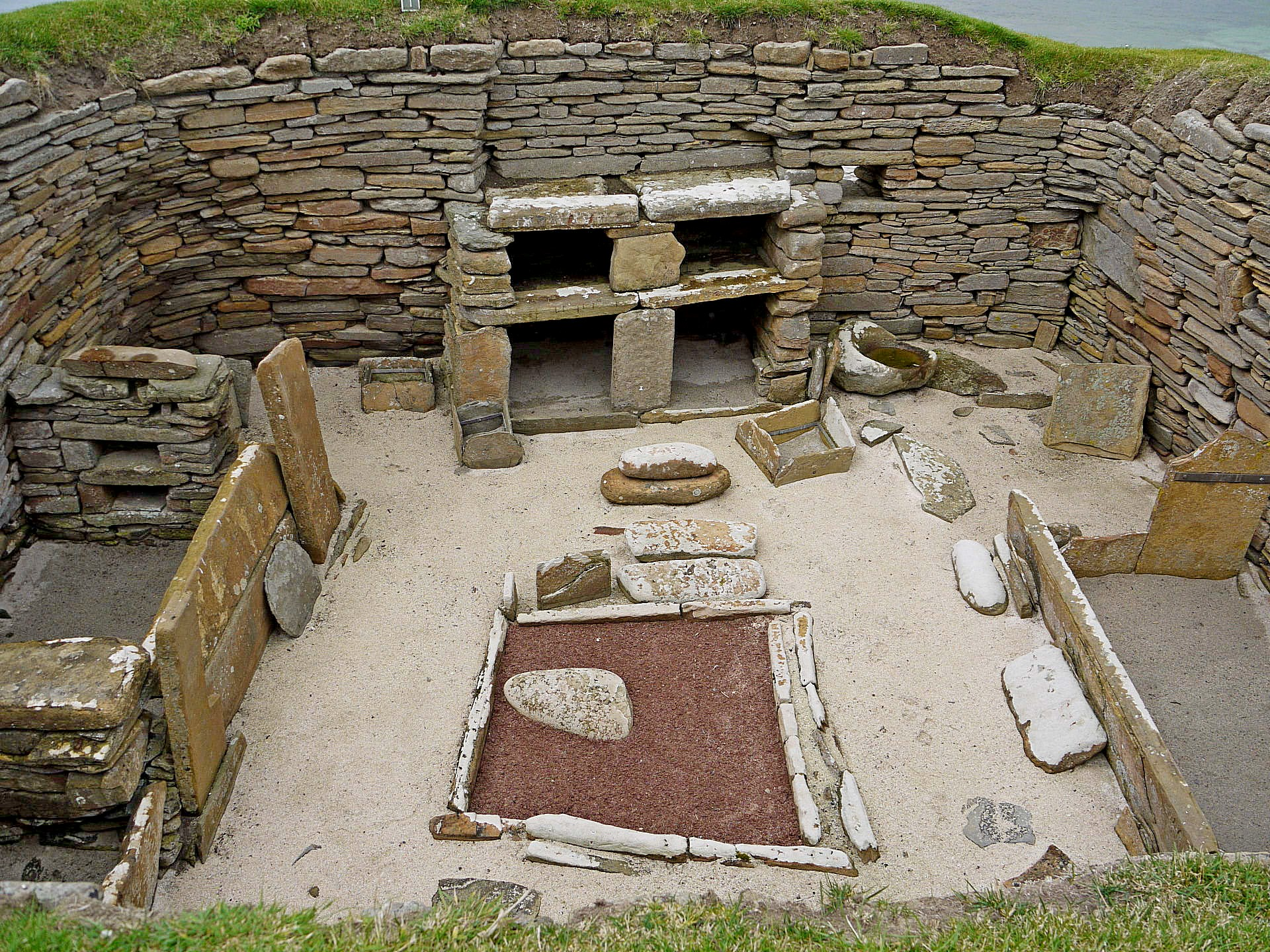
The stone boxes are thought to have held bedding. Skara Brae (occupied 3180 BC to about 2500 BC)

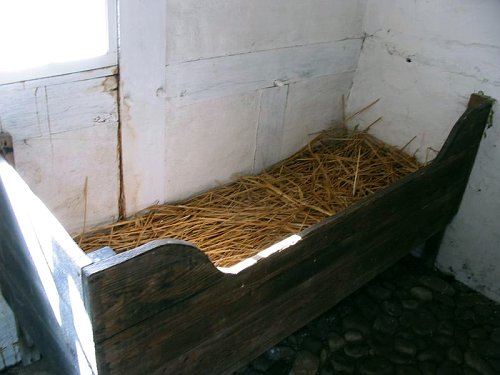
A similar wooden bed filled with straw, but without bedding, at a museum in Denmark

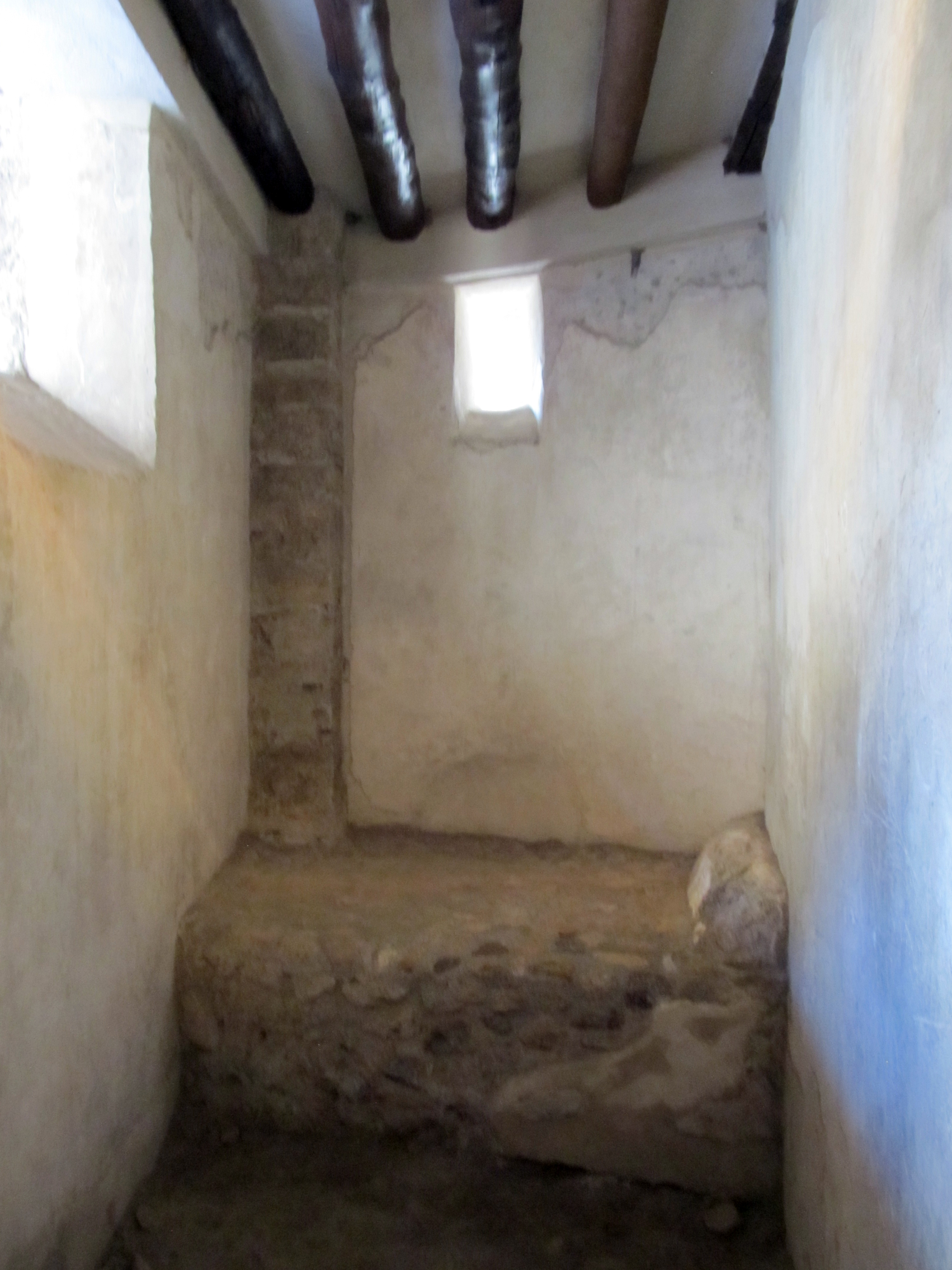
Brick bed, Pompeii

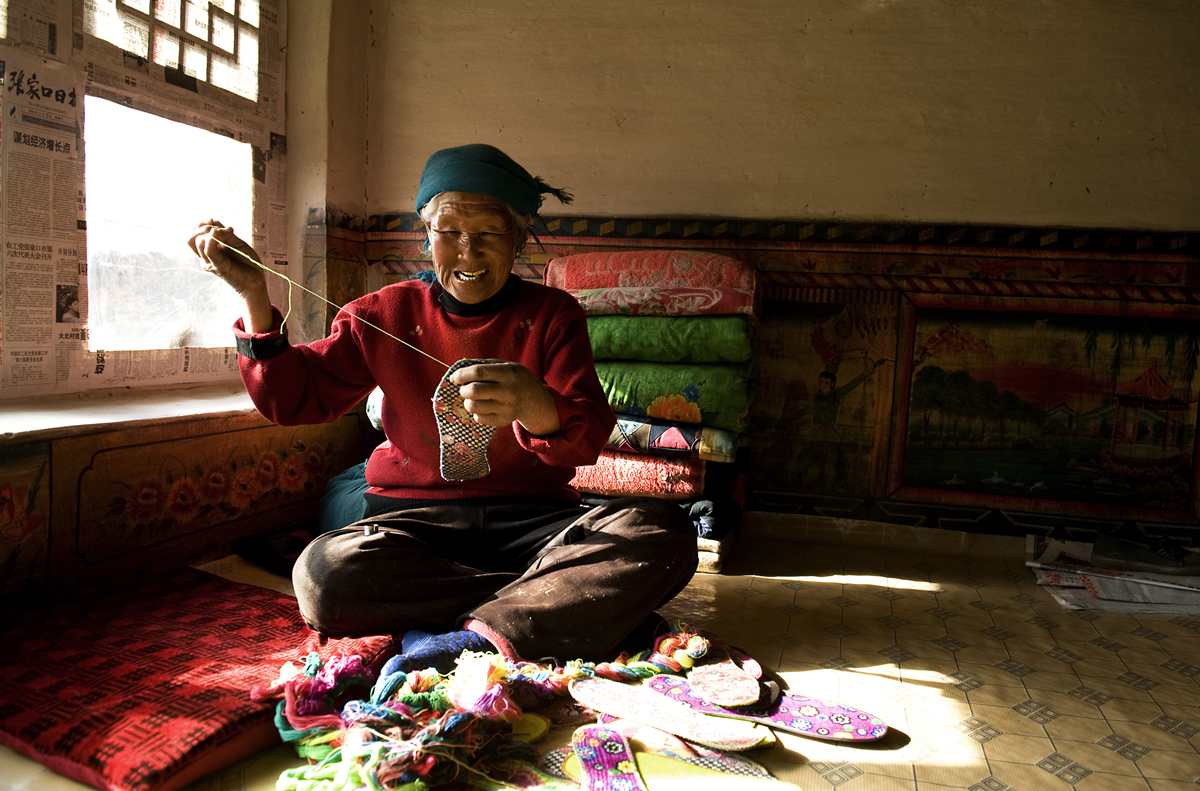
Making shoes on a kang during the day, Yimatu, Chongli District, China. Note bedding, most of it folded and stacked.

Masonry box frames, thought to have been filled with bedding, have been identified at Skara Brae (occupied 3180 BC to about 2500 BC).

While masonry is not soft, a masonry platform can elevate a sleeper above the floor. Mud-brick platforms, covered in mats, were used as furniture by poor people in Ancient Egypt.

Stove beds are masonry stoves with a built-in bench, heated by the fire in the stove. In cold climates, these were often used for sleeping. The Korean ondol, the Chinese kang, many European cocklestoves, and Russian stoves are all variants of this technology. Where people slept on the floor, glorias and other hypocausts provided both underfloor heating by day and heated beds by night. A dol bed is a modern equivalent.

=== Plank beds ===
Plank beds raised above the floor on trestles were used in Europe, but use declined in the 1600s.

=== Woven bed bases ===
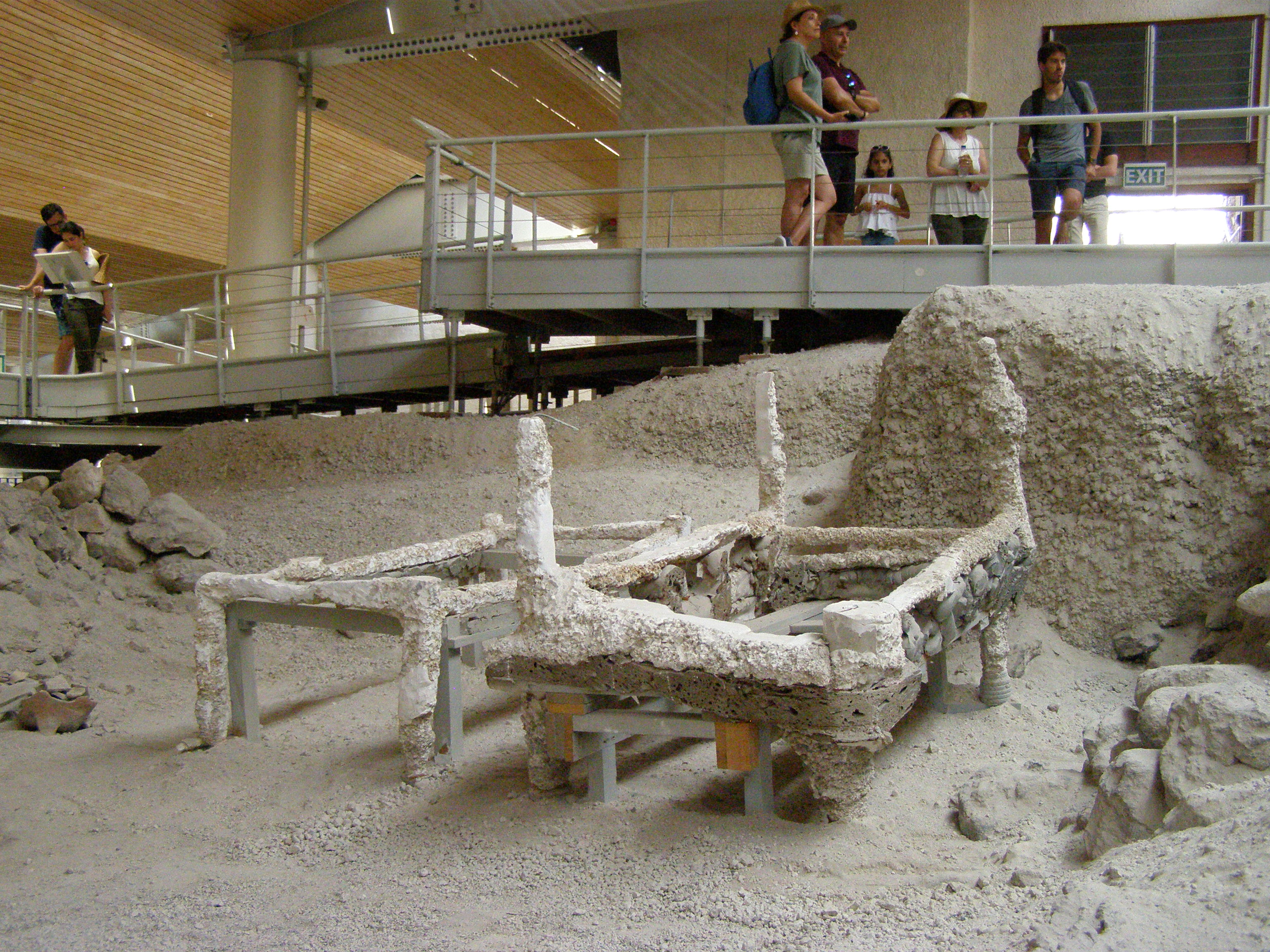
Plaster moulds of bedframes from the 1500s BC Akrotiri settlement, looking like modern charpais. Such frames are light; one has been stacked upside-down on another. Note turned wood leg, far right.

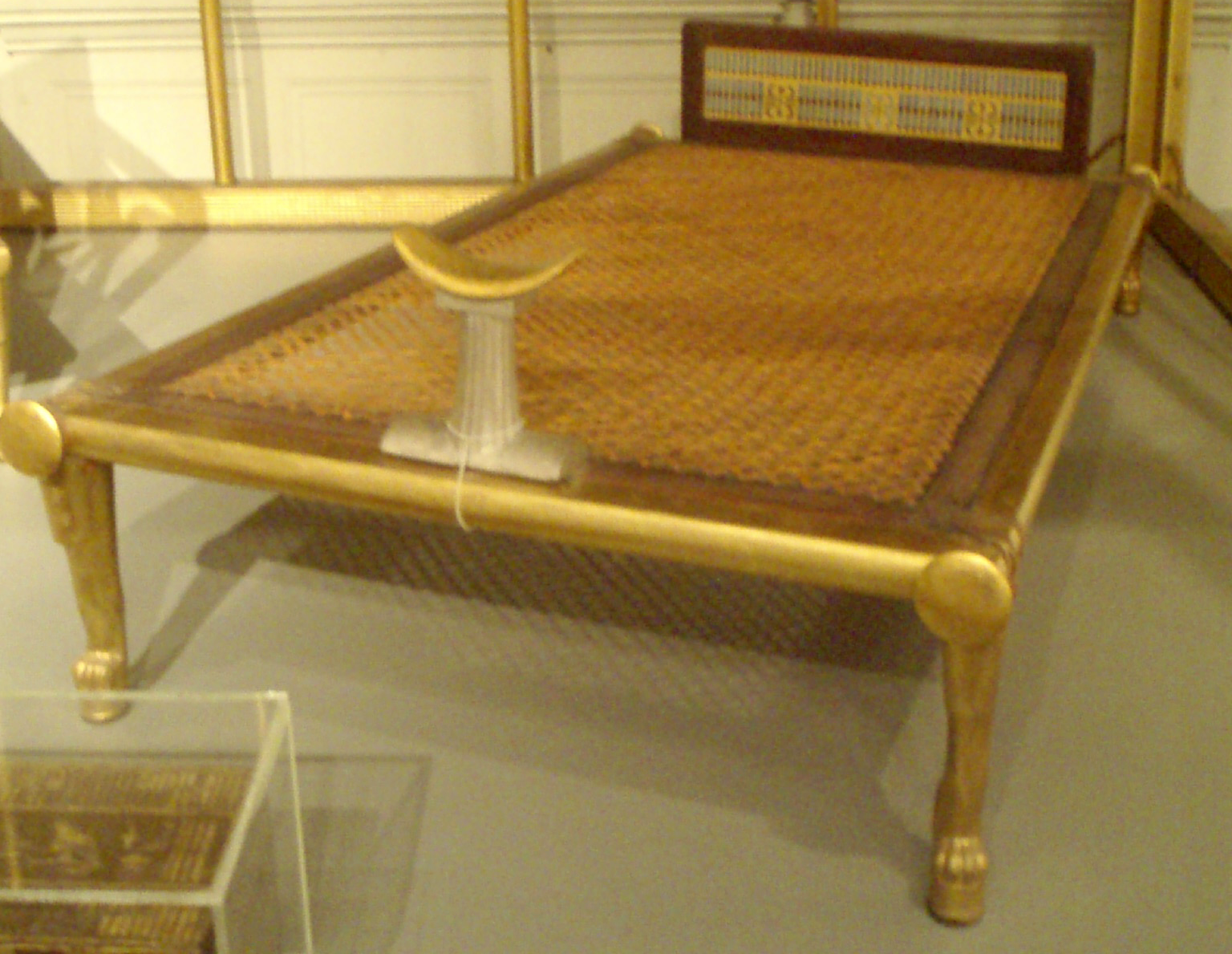
Bed of Queen Hetepheres I, with headrest (near end). 4th Dynasty of Egypt, circa 2575-2528 B.C. Bed is 177 cm (5ft 9in) long.

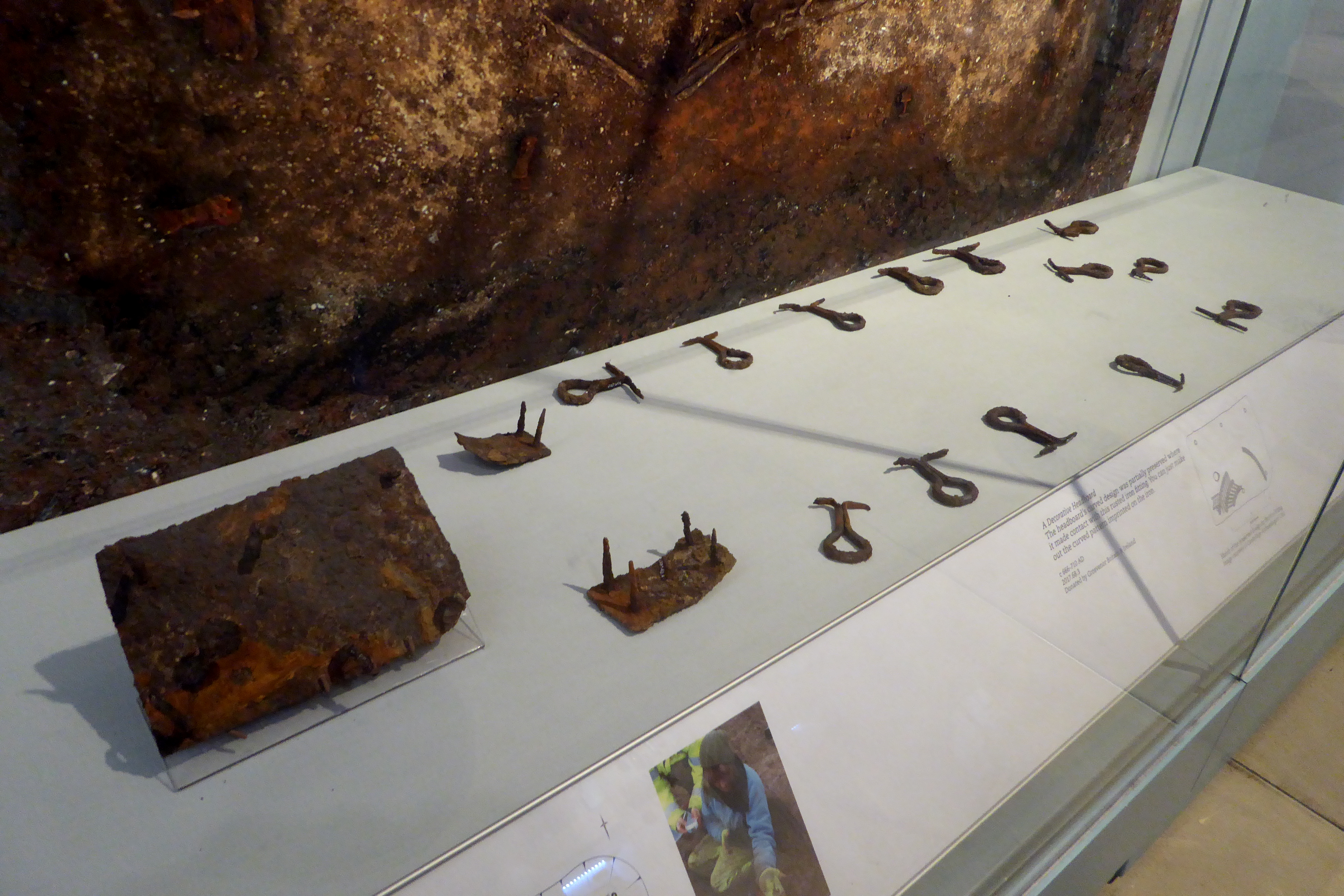
The 600s (7th-century) Anglo-Saxon Trumpington bed burial held a 60cm by 155cm bed with pieces of looped wrought iron, which may have held the bed base. The beds are thought by the excavators to have been the ones used in life, not purpose-made grave goods.

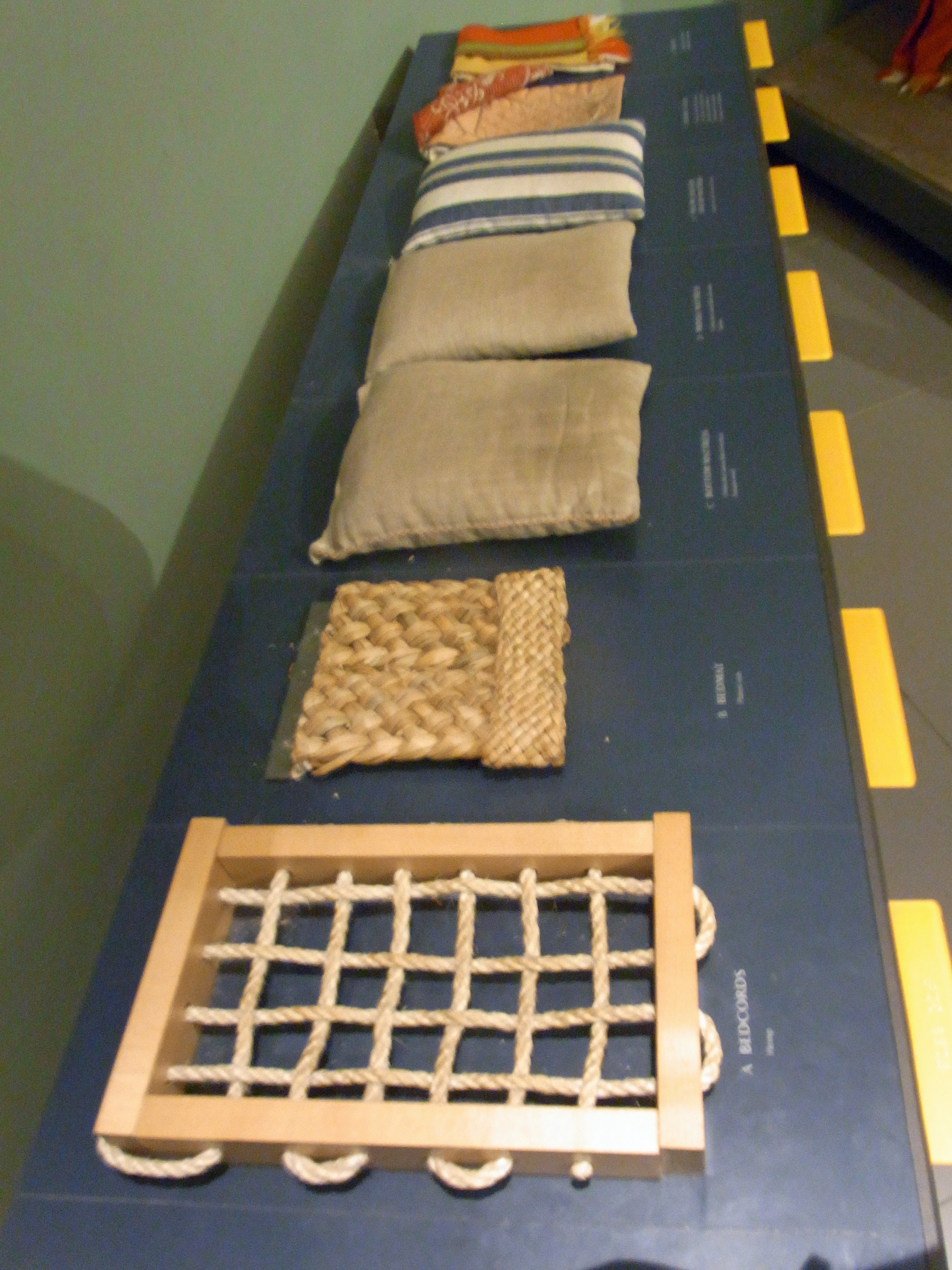
The Great Bed of Ware's layers, museum display samples: bedcords (rope lattice), bedmat (woven), three layers of mattresses, bedlinen.

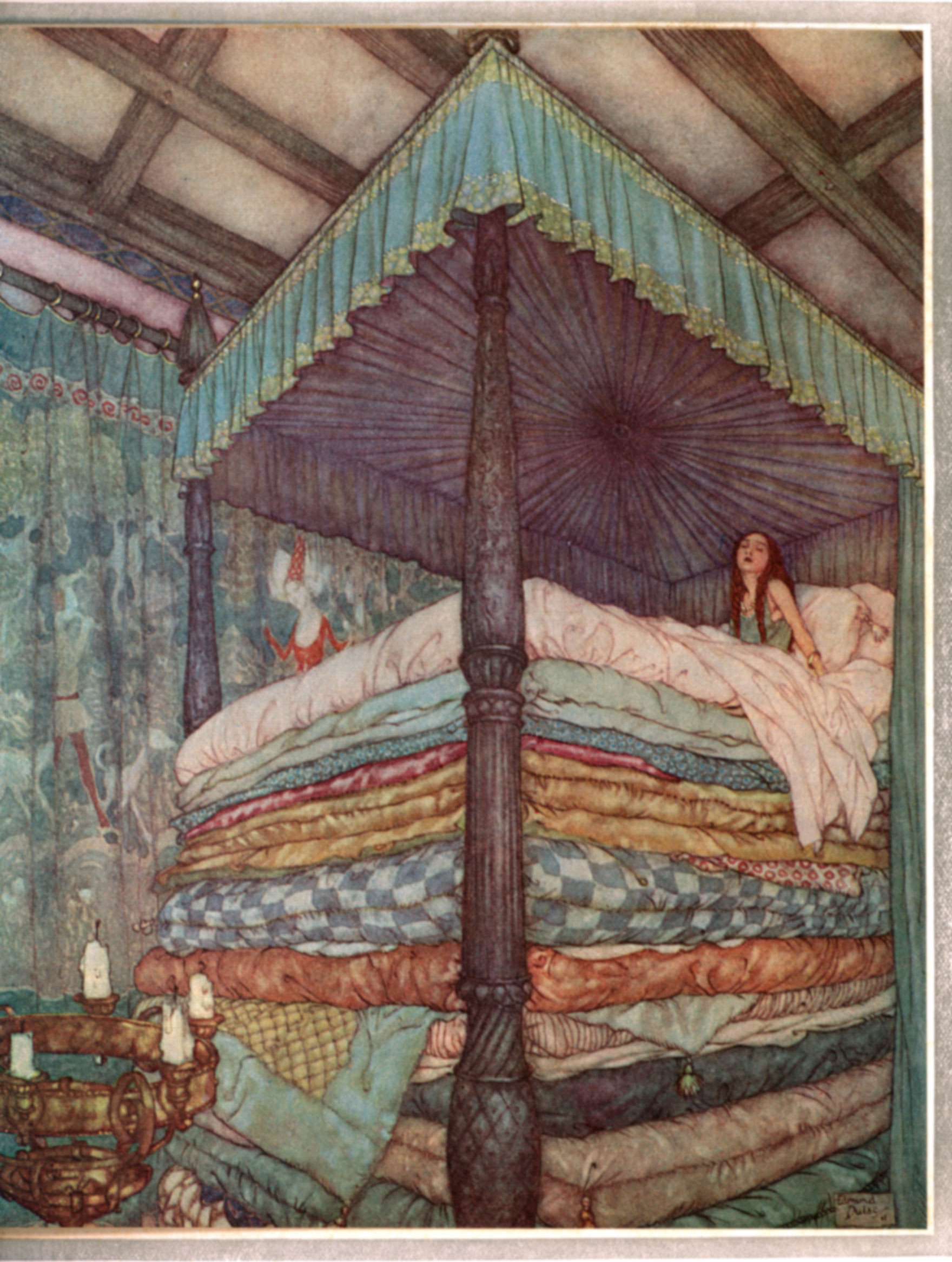
The fairytale The Princess and the Pea exaggerates the layering of thin mattresses common in traditional European beds

Rope beds support the mattress or sleeper with a lattice of rope. Other woven bases use braid, straps, rushes, cloth or other weaving materials.

Some of the earliest surviving beds are from Ancient Egyptian tombs. These beds have wooden frames, glued and lashed together. In some cases the woven bed support survives. Some Ancient Egyptian beds were made with reeds or plaited string.

Tutankhamen's tomb contained beds (one of gilded ebony). Studies of ancient hieroglyphs suggest that the platform beds were revered in Egyptian culture. While common people slept on simpler constructions, the trend developed to decorate the woods surface with gilding and paints and also to use carving to enhance the beauty of this utilitarian object. Ivory, exotic woods and metal were used as inlay or even as the entire foot on the best constructions, bringing artistic design to a commonplace object.

In hot climates, ventilation through the woven bed base helps keep the sleeper cool, and the bed base is sufficiently flexible not to need padding.

In cold climates, a woven bed base would be topped with insulation. Traditionally, in Europe and the Americas, this was one or more insulating mattresses: cloth bags stuffed with a variety of materials (see above), and possibly also a canopy hung with warm curtains. Modernly, it might be topped by a thin futon or other roll-up mattress.

==== Parallel-woven bed bases ====
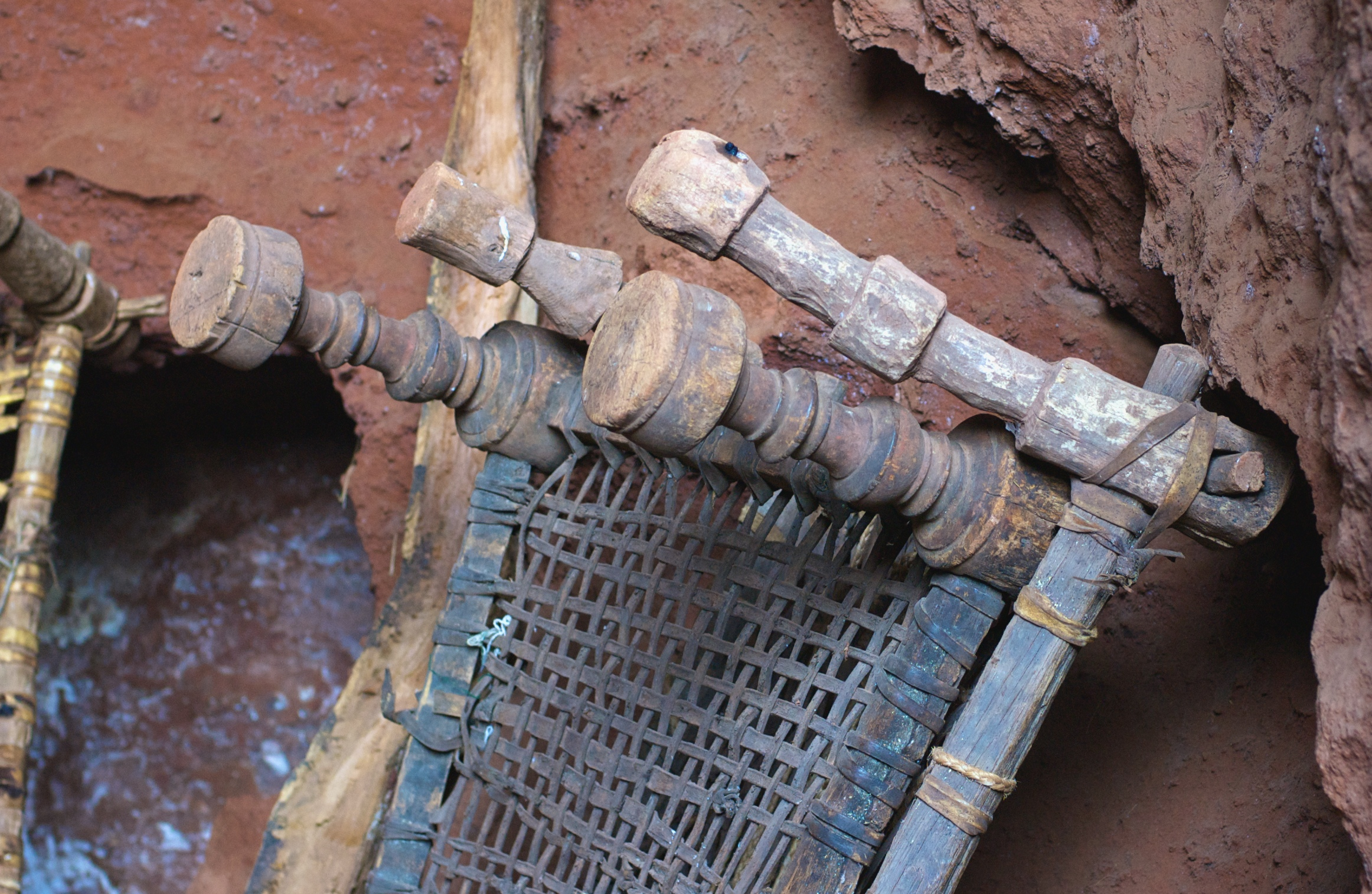
Traditional Ethiopian bed frames, lathe-turned and handcarved, Rock-Hewn Churches, Lalibela.

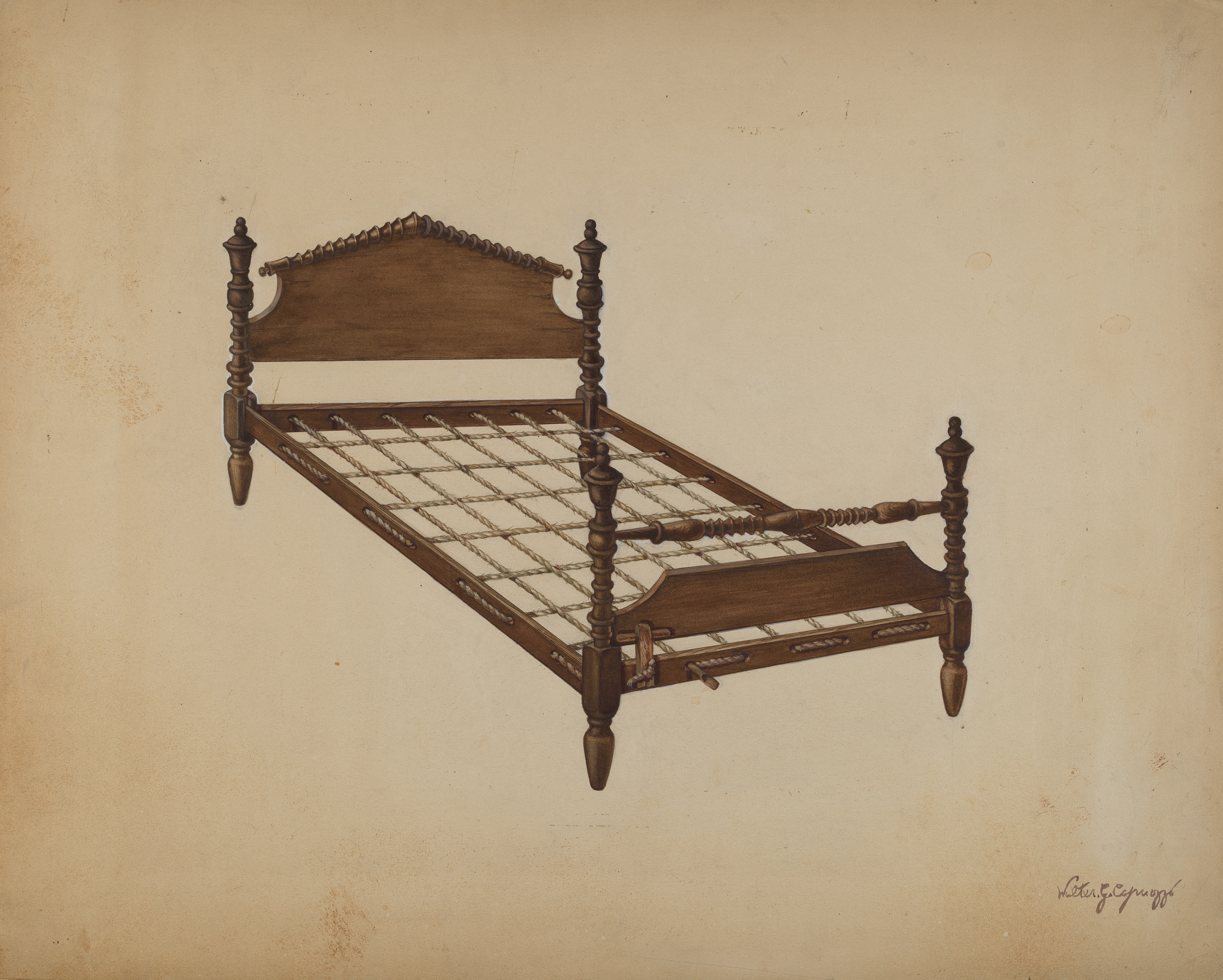
Traditional American rope bed, circa 1939. Note loops of rope through frame, and tensioning wedge at near corner.

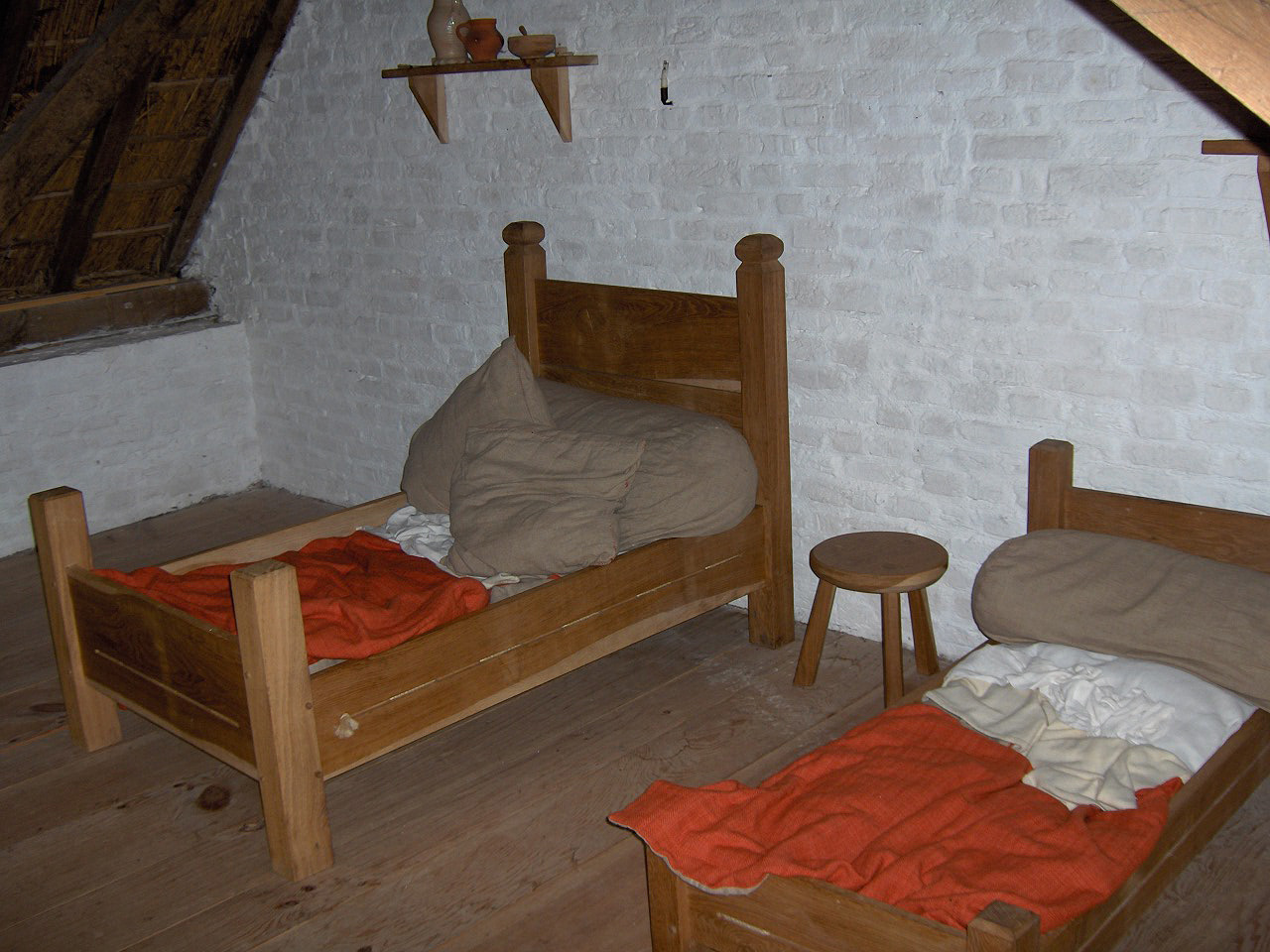
Medieval-reconstruction rope beds (circa 1465, Belgium, northern Europe). Note loops of rope protruding from side boards. With mattrasses, the large pillows then fashionable, linen pillowcases and sheets, and madder-dyed red blankets.

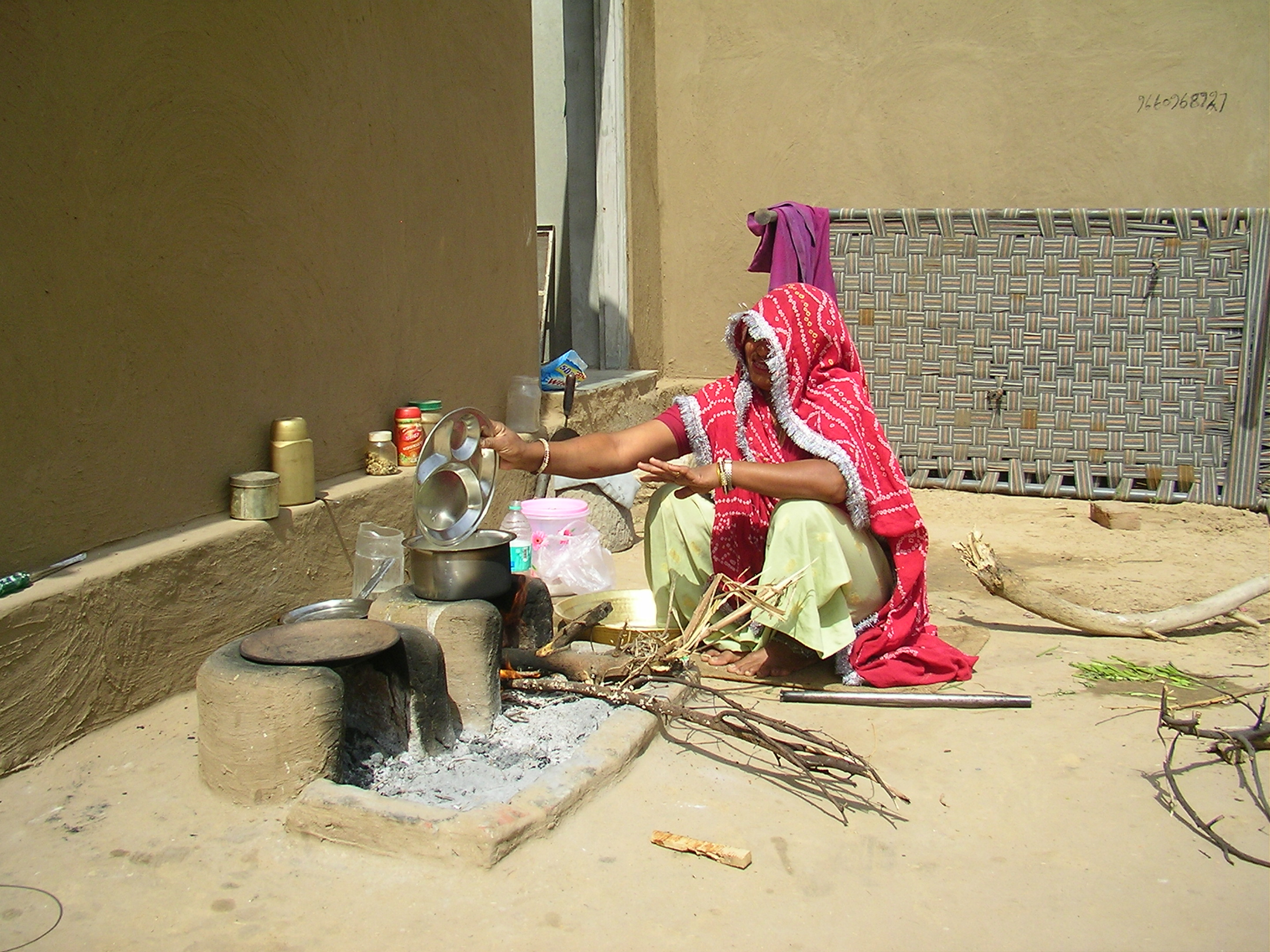
Parallel-woven charpai in Rajasthan, tipped up against the wall for the day

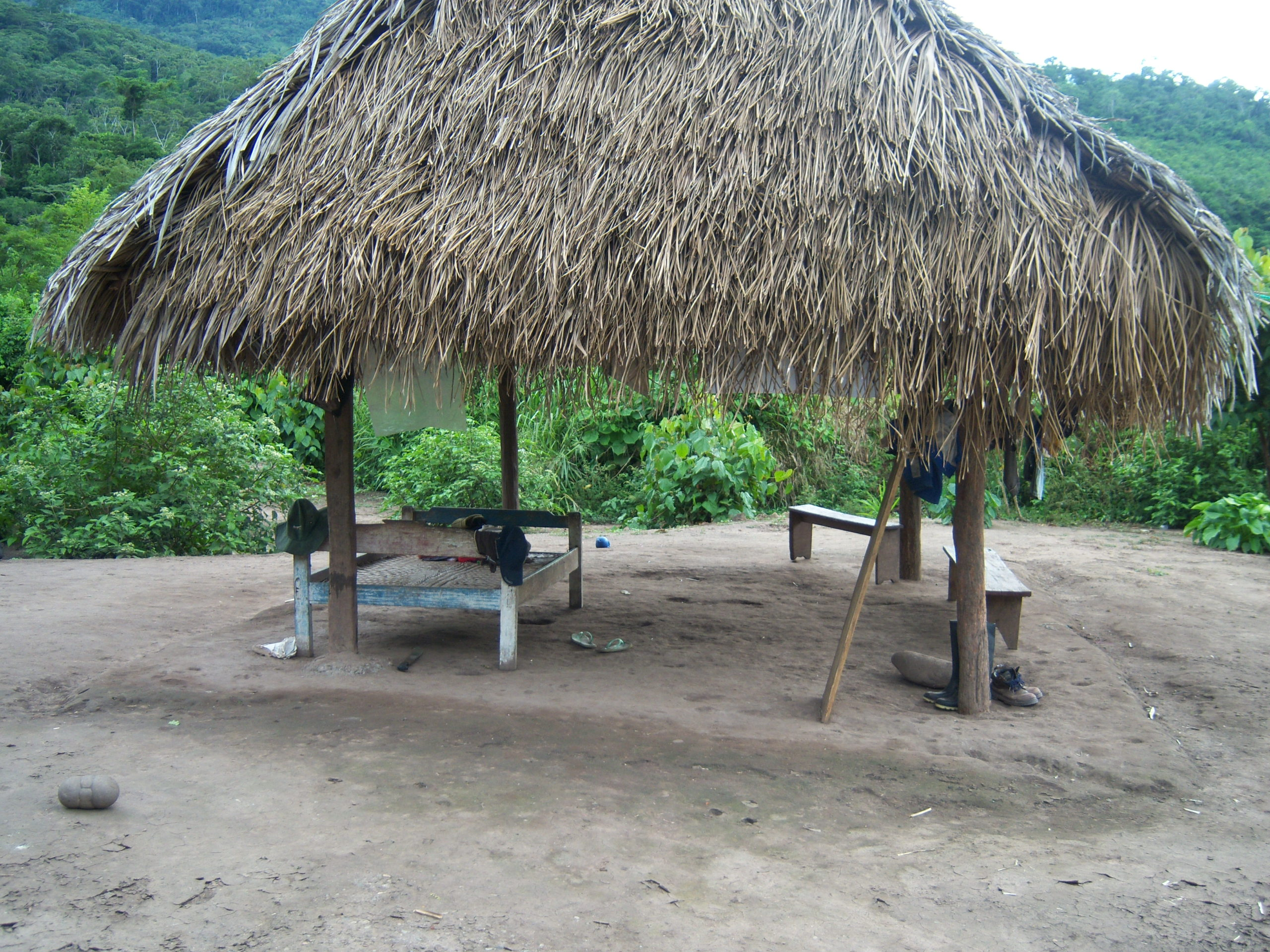
Woven bed base in Aoti, in the Peruvian rainforest

Many traditional European rope beds are woven with the ropes parallel to the ends and sides of the bed. They need to be tightened regularly — with a bed key (UK) or bed wrench (US), and sometimes with wedges — as they sag. They must also be re-strung occasionally; re-stringing reduces sag and evens out wear. When fully or partly unstrung, they can be packed flat for transport.

==== Bias-woven bed bases ====
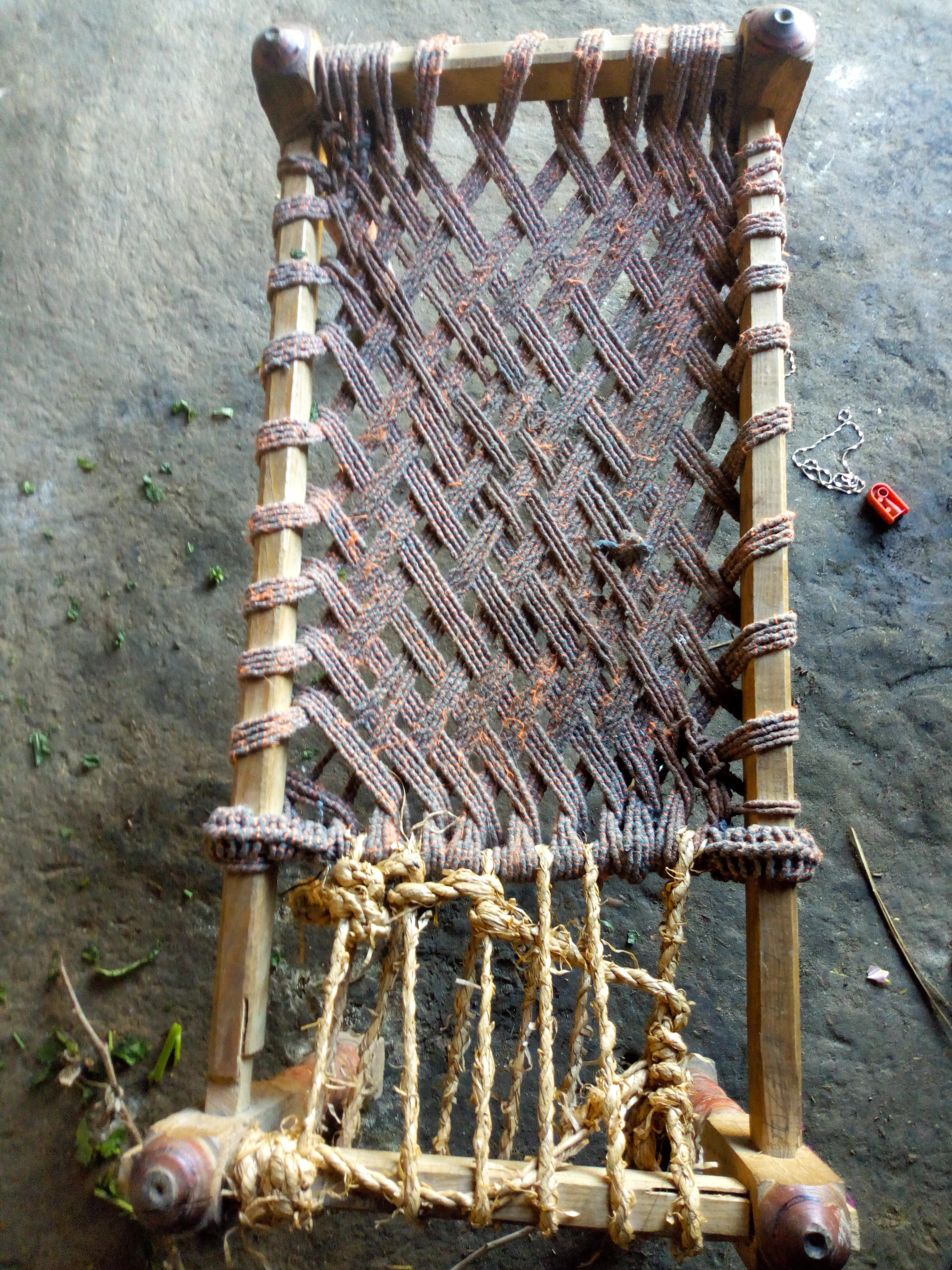
A small charpoi in Pakistan, 2019, showing structure, and retensioning lashing.

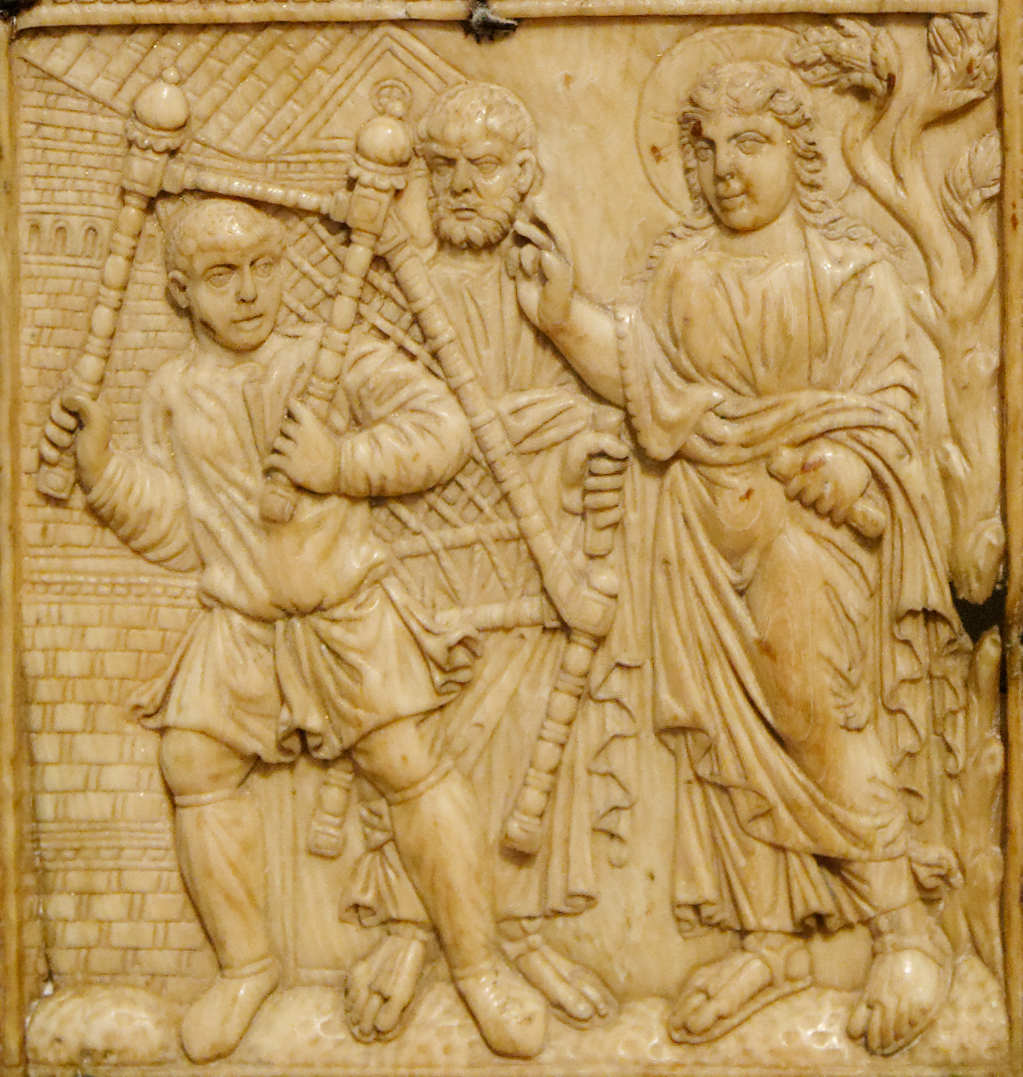
An 800s European Healing at Bethesda scene, showing a bias-woven rope bed

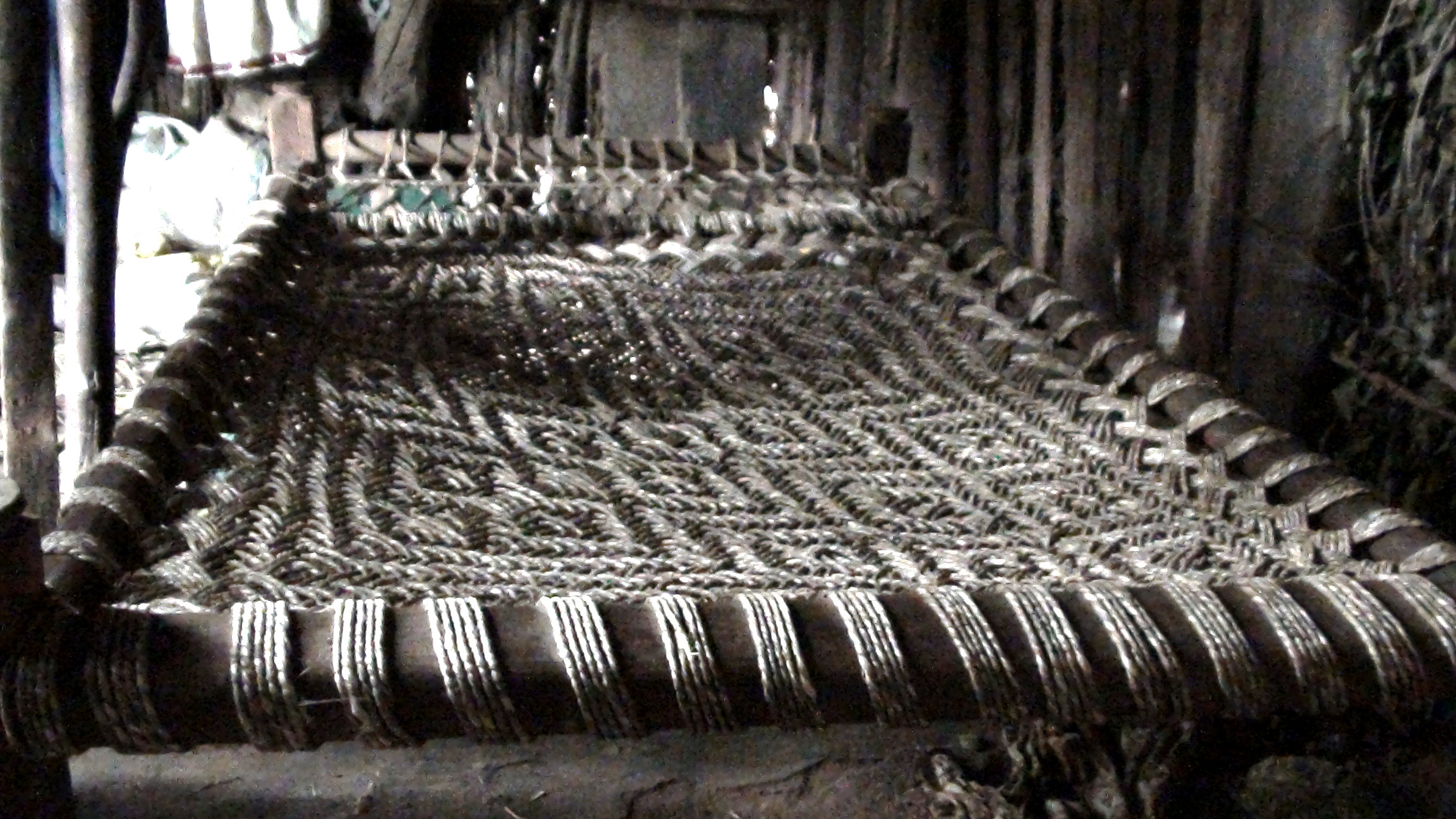
Santhal bed woven of sabai grass

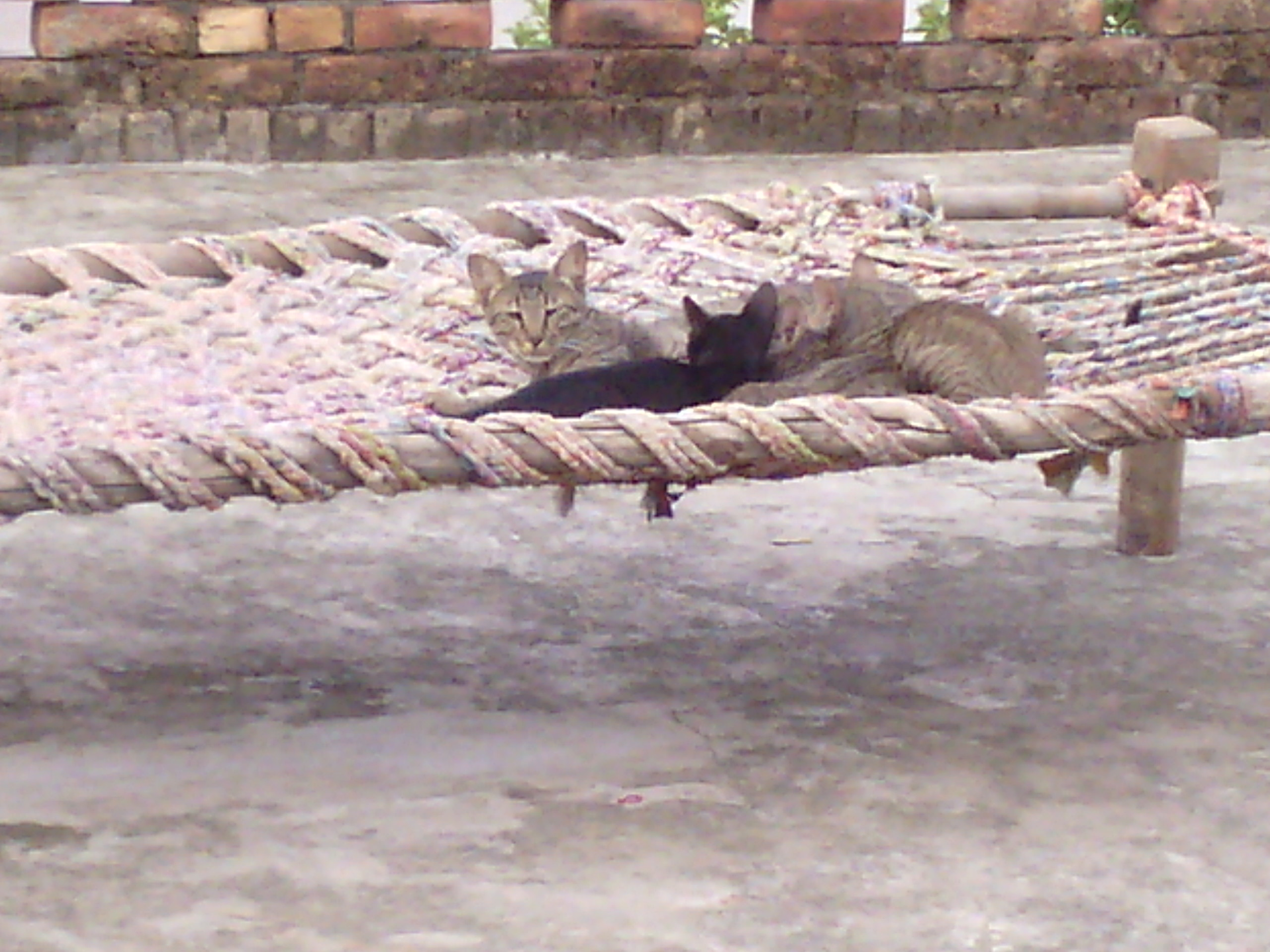
Cats in a sagging charpai

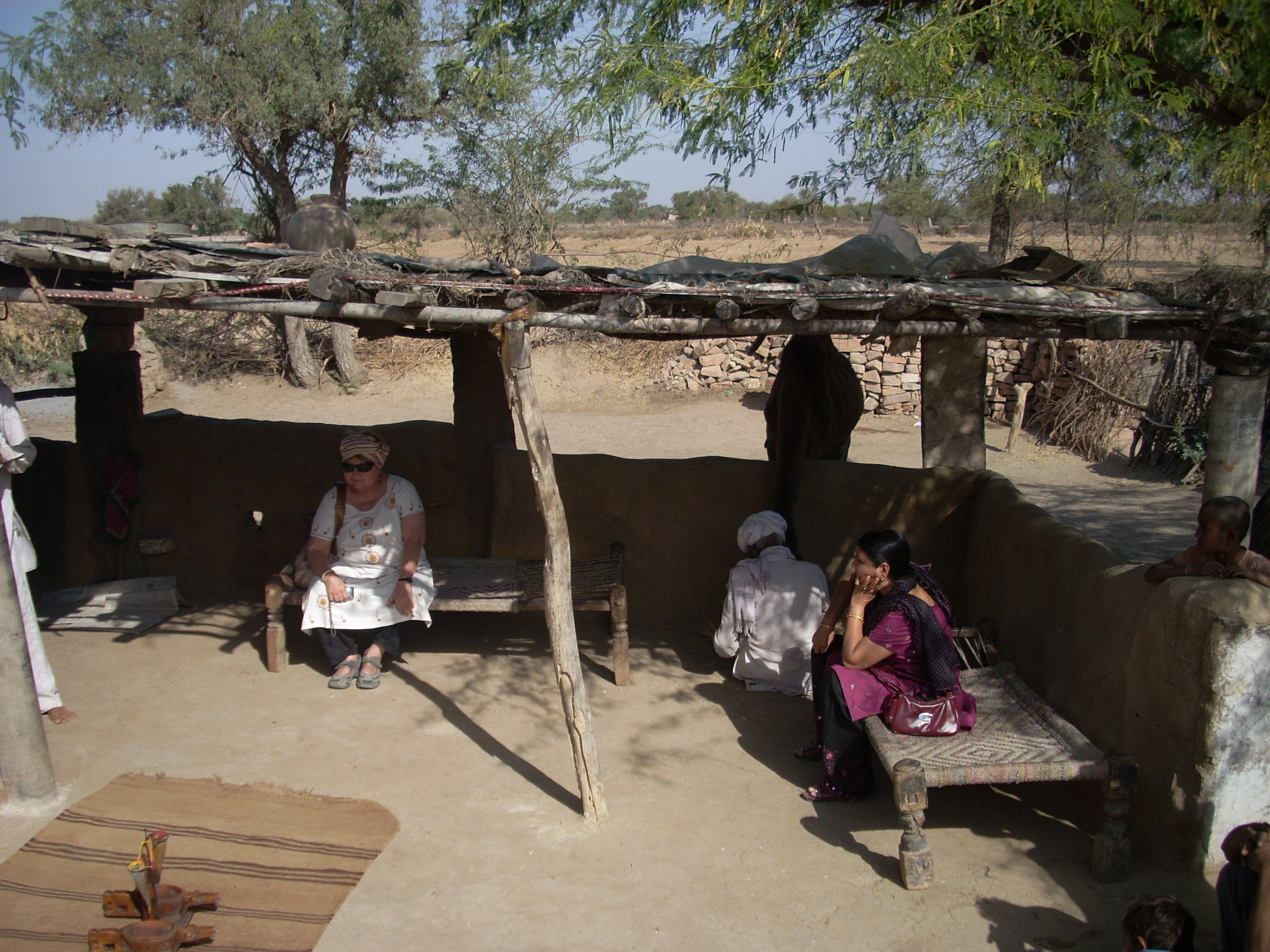
Charpais used as daybeds in Rajasthan

Some rope beds are bias-woven; other bias-woven beds are made with braided cord, straps, rushes, and similar. These lattices are often directly attached to only three side of the frame, with the fourth side lashed to the end of the bed (see image). This means that to retension the bed, only the lashing has to be tightened; the whole bed does not need to be restrung. Charpais, widely used in modern India, are usually made ont this pattern. Charpai are quite light and easy to move.

==== Cloth bed bases ====
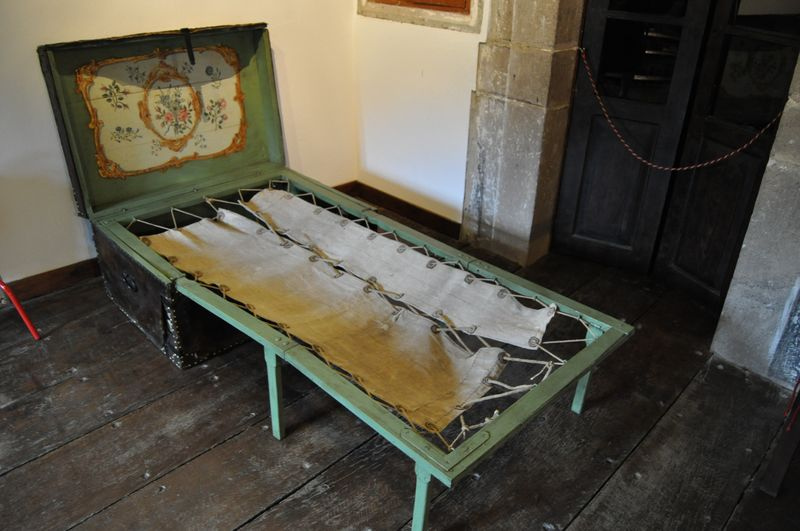
A chest-hideabed in the Casona de Tudanca, with lashings to retension it.

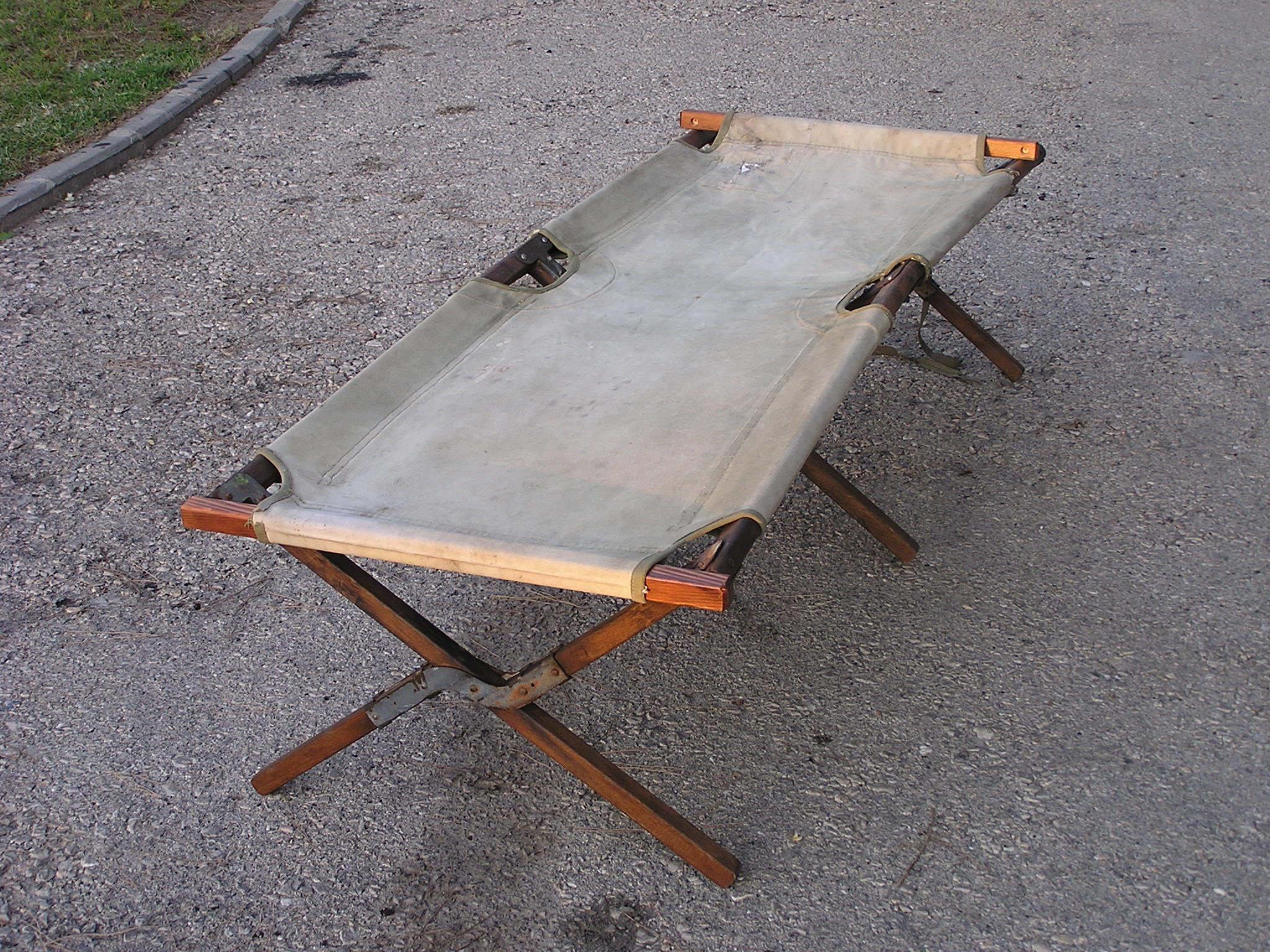
A mid-20-century folding camp bed, wood, cotton duck, and metal

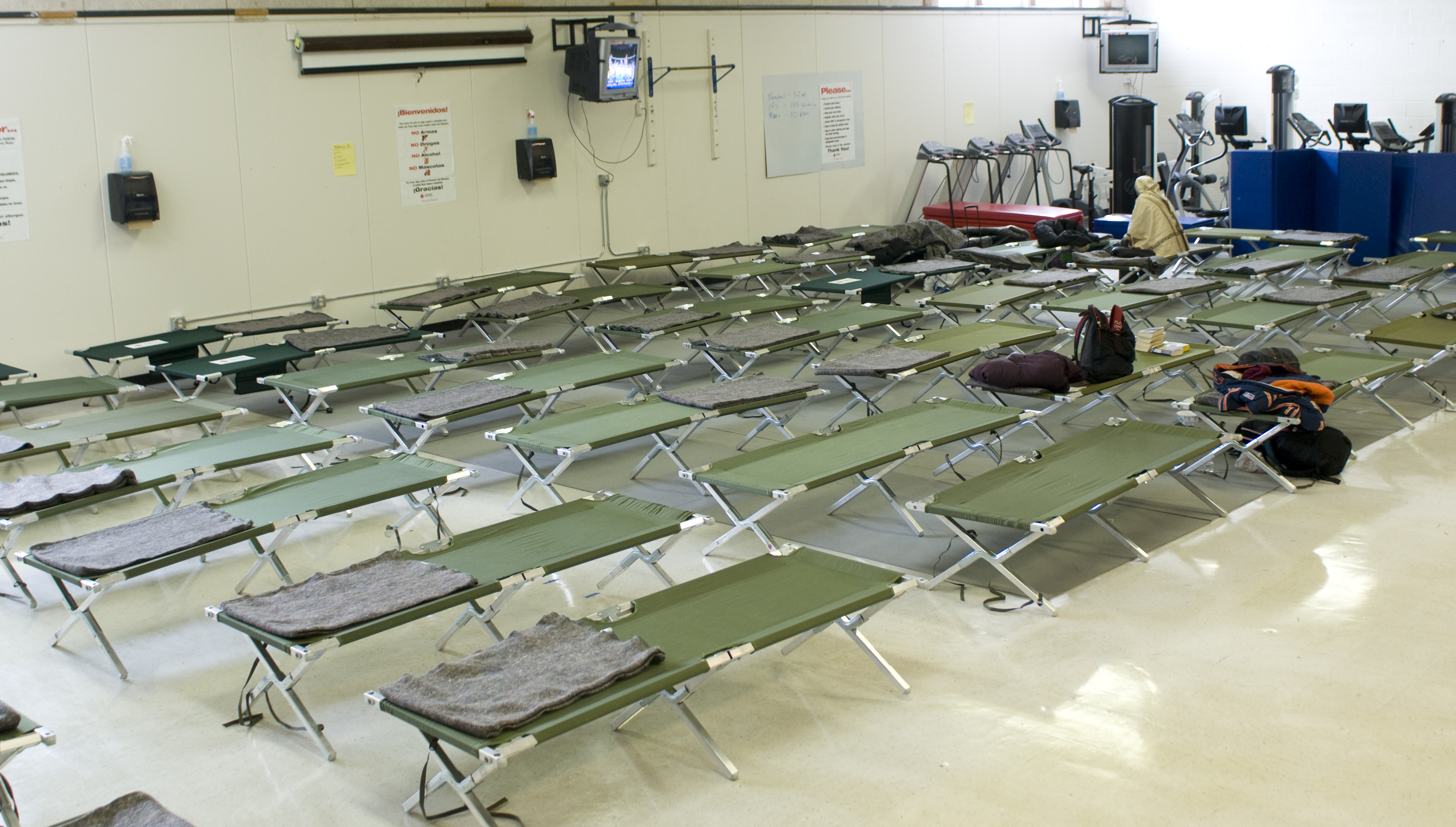
Very similar beds, but with aluminum frames and a lighter, less taut cloth, in a Red Cross shelter in 2009

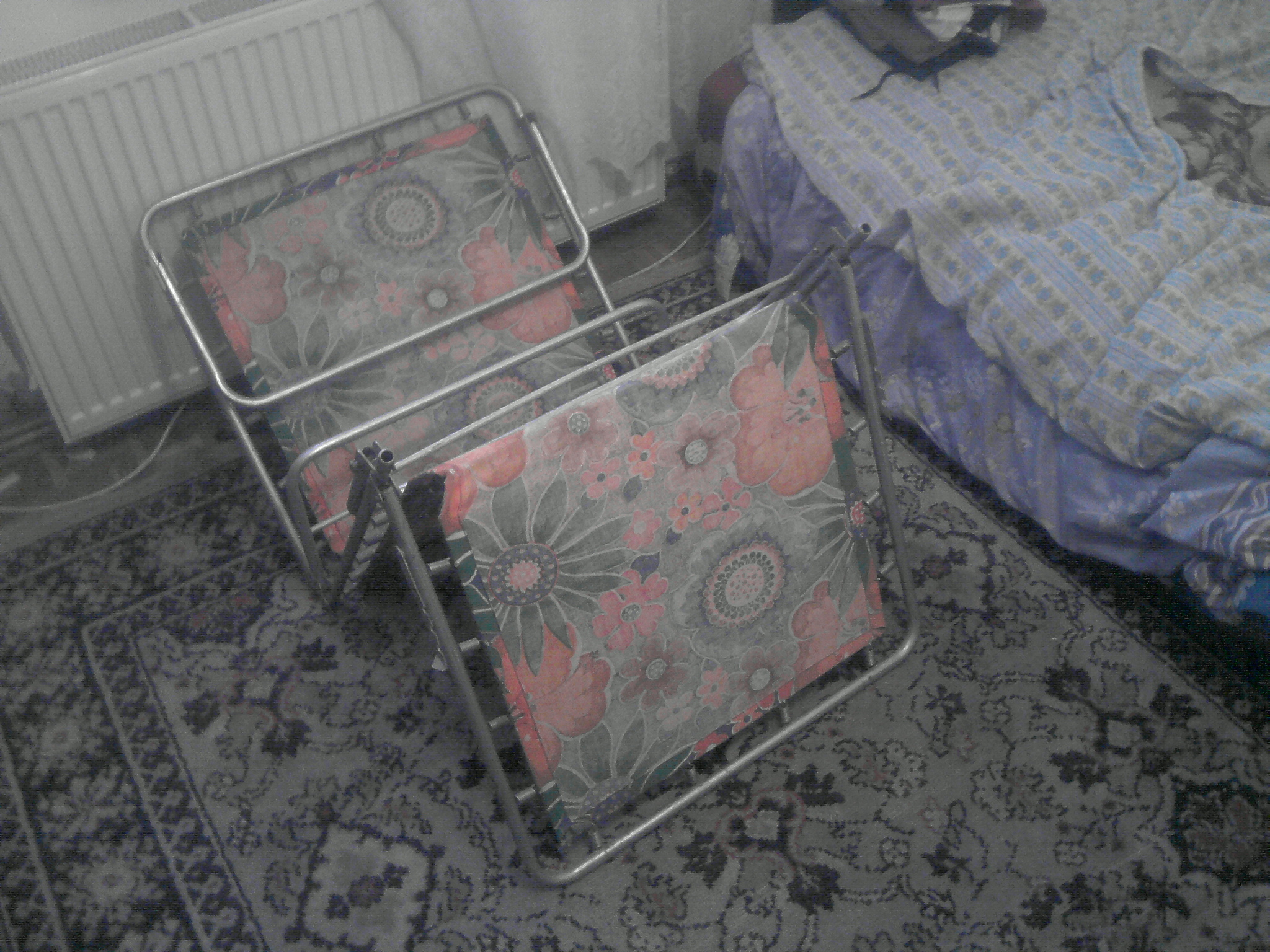
An aluminum folding bed, of the sort widely used in many Eastern Bloc countries. The cloth is tensioned by metal springs all round

With cheap mass-produced cloth, it became increasingly practical to use cloth as a bed support. Retensioning issues remained, so the cloth was sometimes attached to the frame by lashings or springs.

=== Inflatable bed bases ===
Air mattresses are recorded in the 1400s; Louis XI, king of France, had one made of leather.

=== Sprung beds ===
==== Wooden slats ====
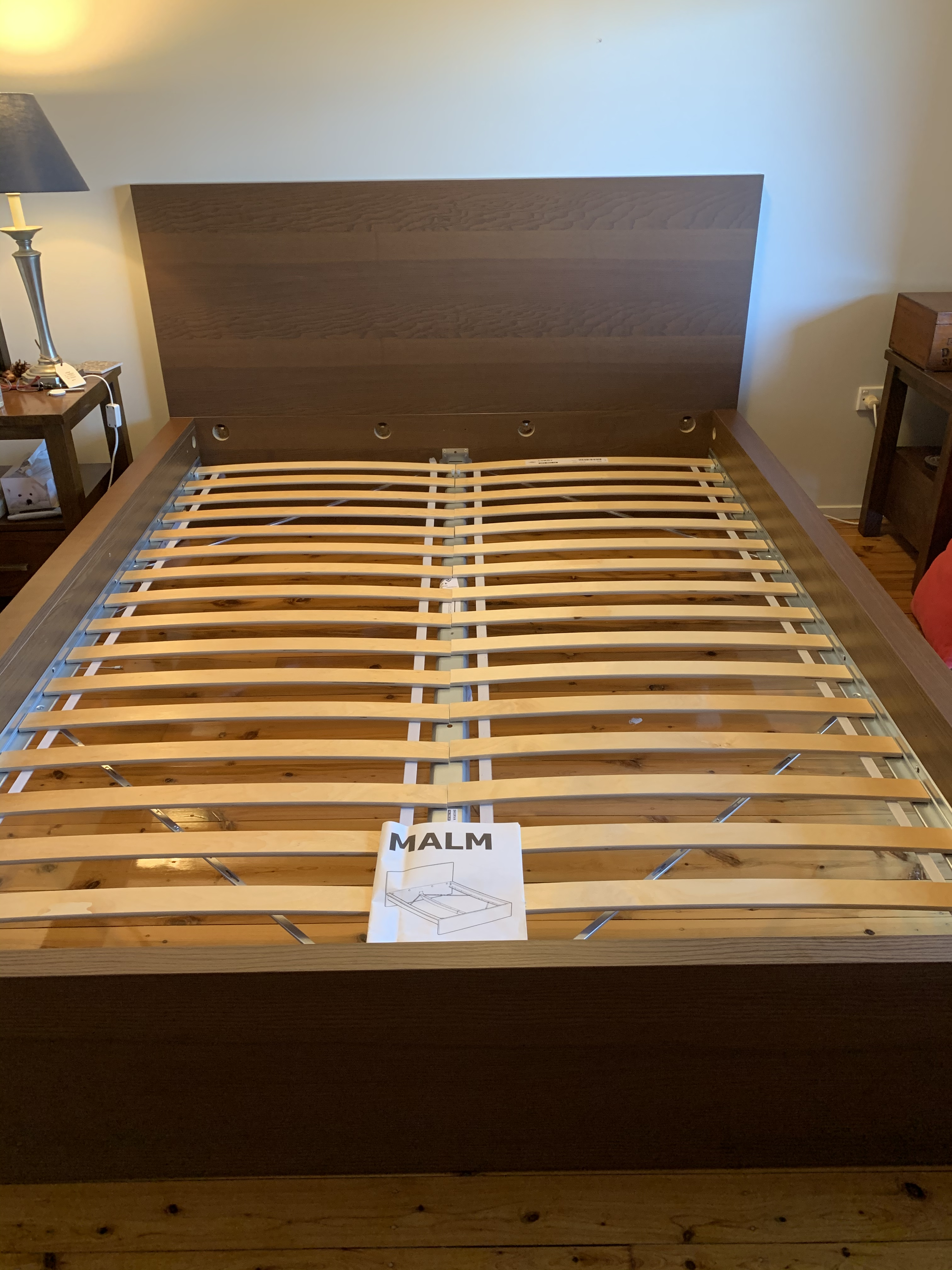
A mass-produced flat-pack bed with two sets of slats, 2019. Note central longitudinal support, and two straps binding each set of slats together

An all-wood foundation usually has seven or eight support slats, long laths of wood laid across the frame.

The Ancient Egyptians used slatted beds, and the Ancient Greeks may have used them.

In Europe, bedslats were at one point nailed to the frame, but that made disassembling a bed very difficult. In the 1400s, the slats were all attached to two lengthwise straps, and their ends laid loosely on ledges built on both sides; the ledge held them up, and the straps stopped them from sliding along and bunching up (which would leave holes the mattress could slide through). This assemblage of loosely-linked slats could easily be rolled up and transported with the disassembled bedframe. Such slat bases are still in widespread use today.

More modernly, the slats may be topped by a sheet of paperboard or beaverboard, often with holes in it to ventilate the mattress. This foundation, variously called a "no-flex", "low-flex" or zero-deflection unit, as well as an "ortho box", provides support similar to a platform foundation.

All-wood slat foundations, initially rare in the U.S., have become increasingly prevalent as U.S. mattress makers shifted to super-thick, one-sided mattresses (as of 2012).

==== Metal springing ====
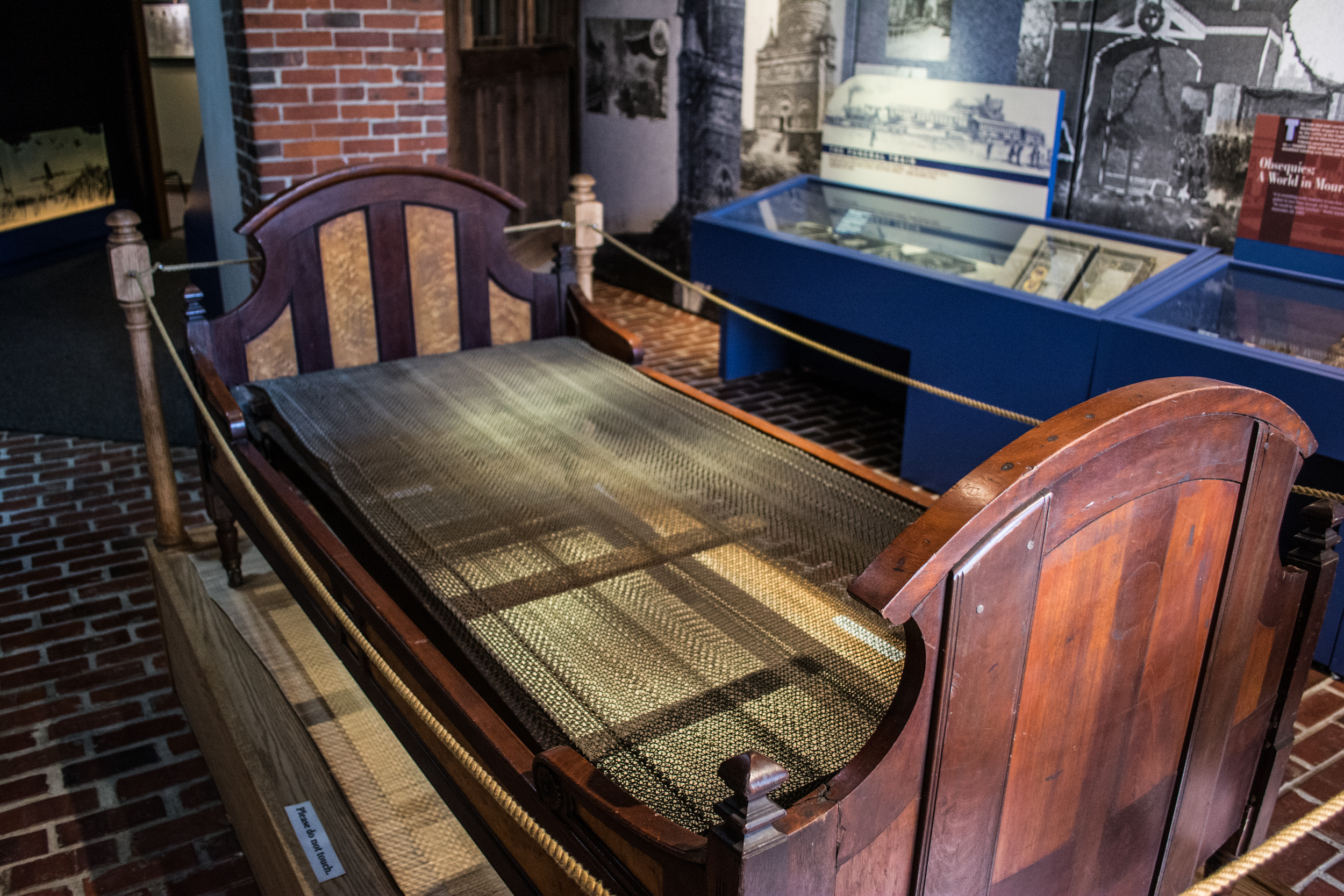
A woven-steel bed base

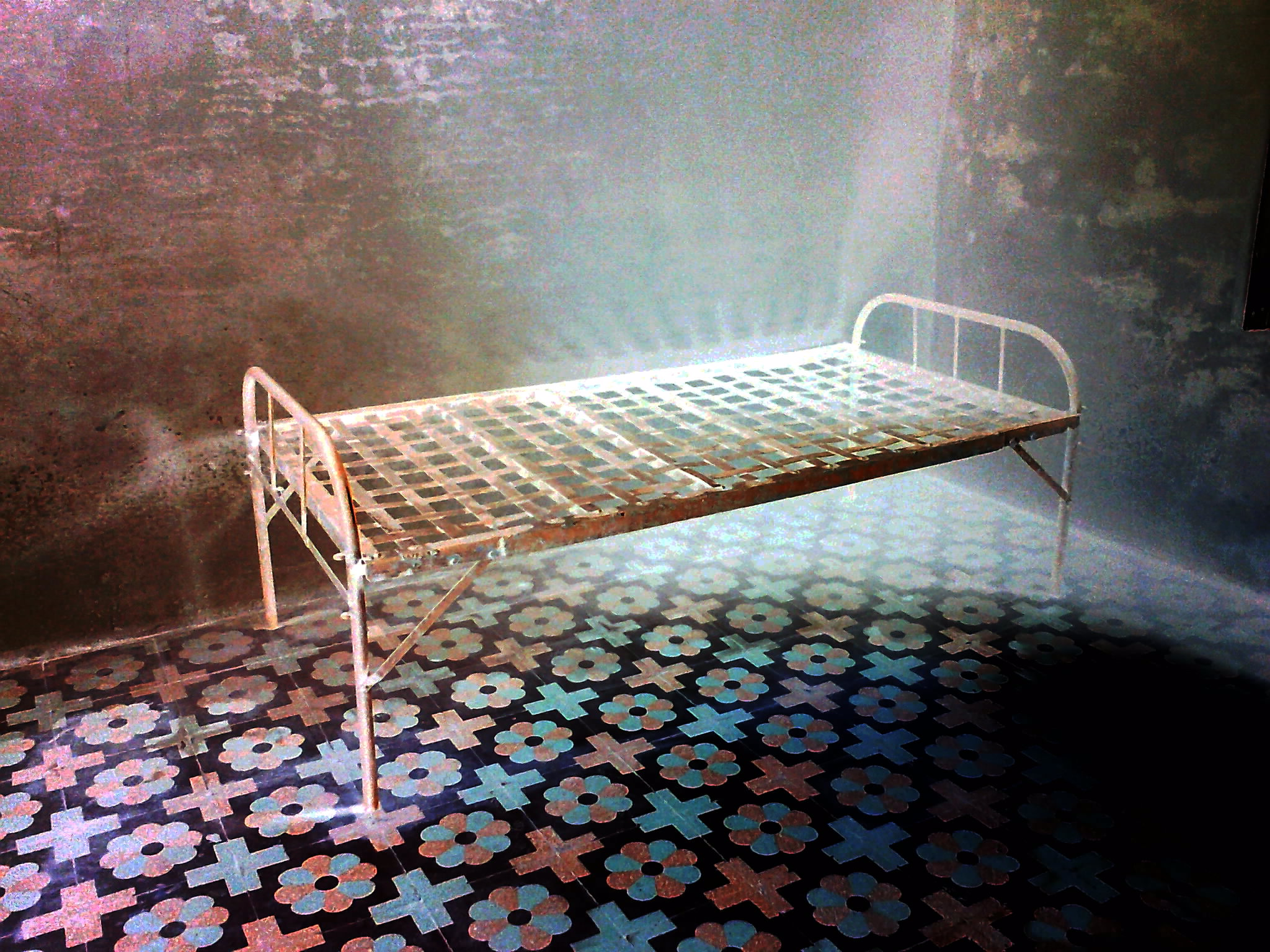
A steel-strap bed base in Chinawal village, India

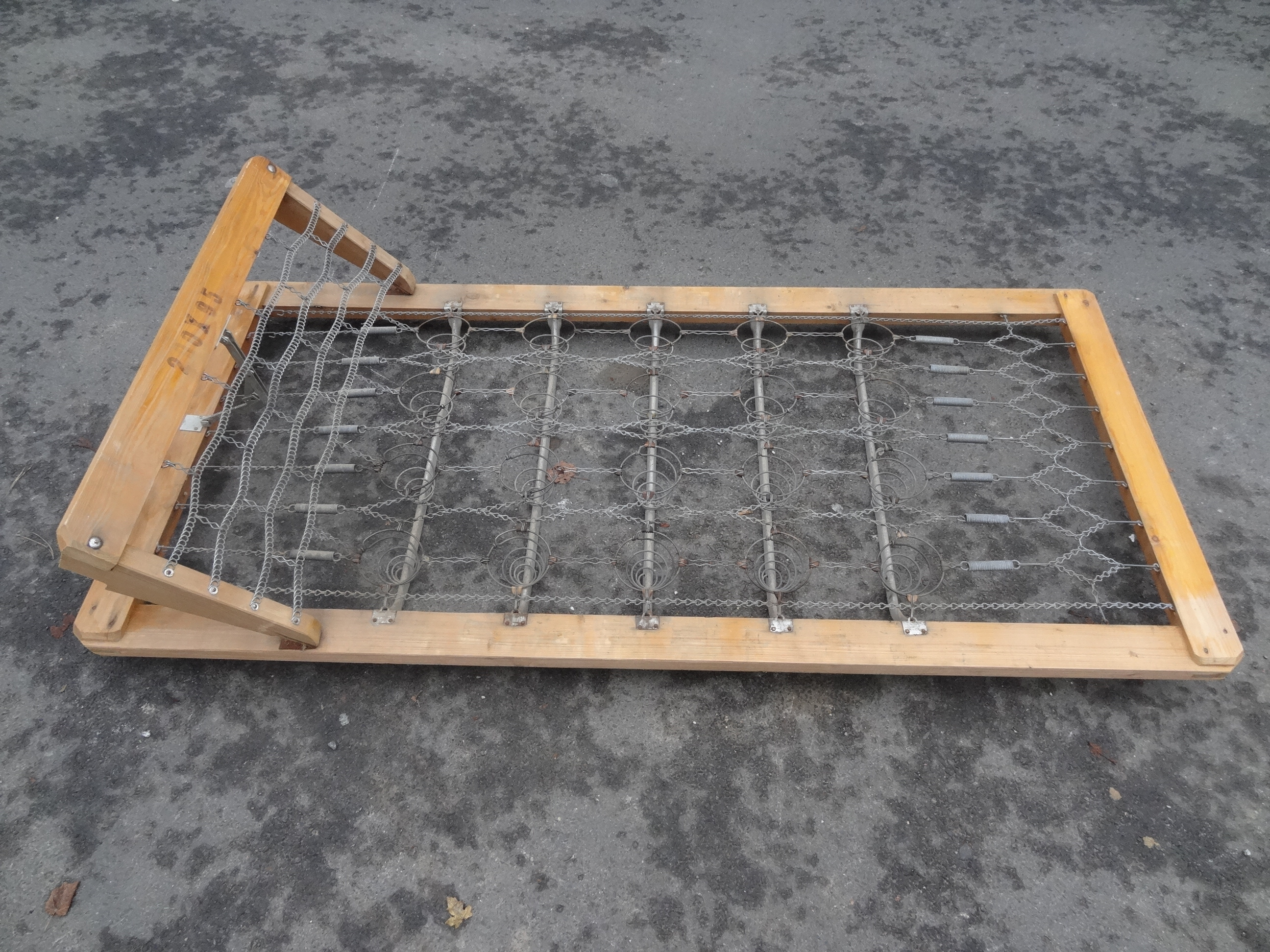
Springs bound only at the top, and set upon steel slats. 1970s Germany

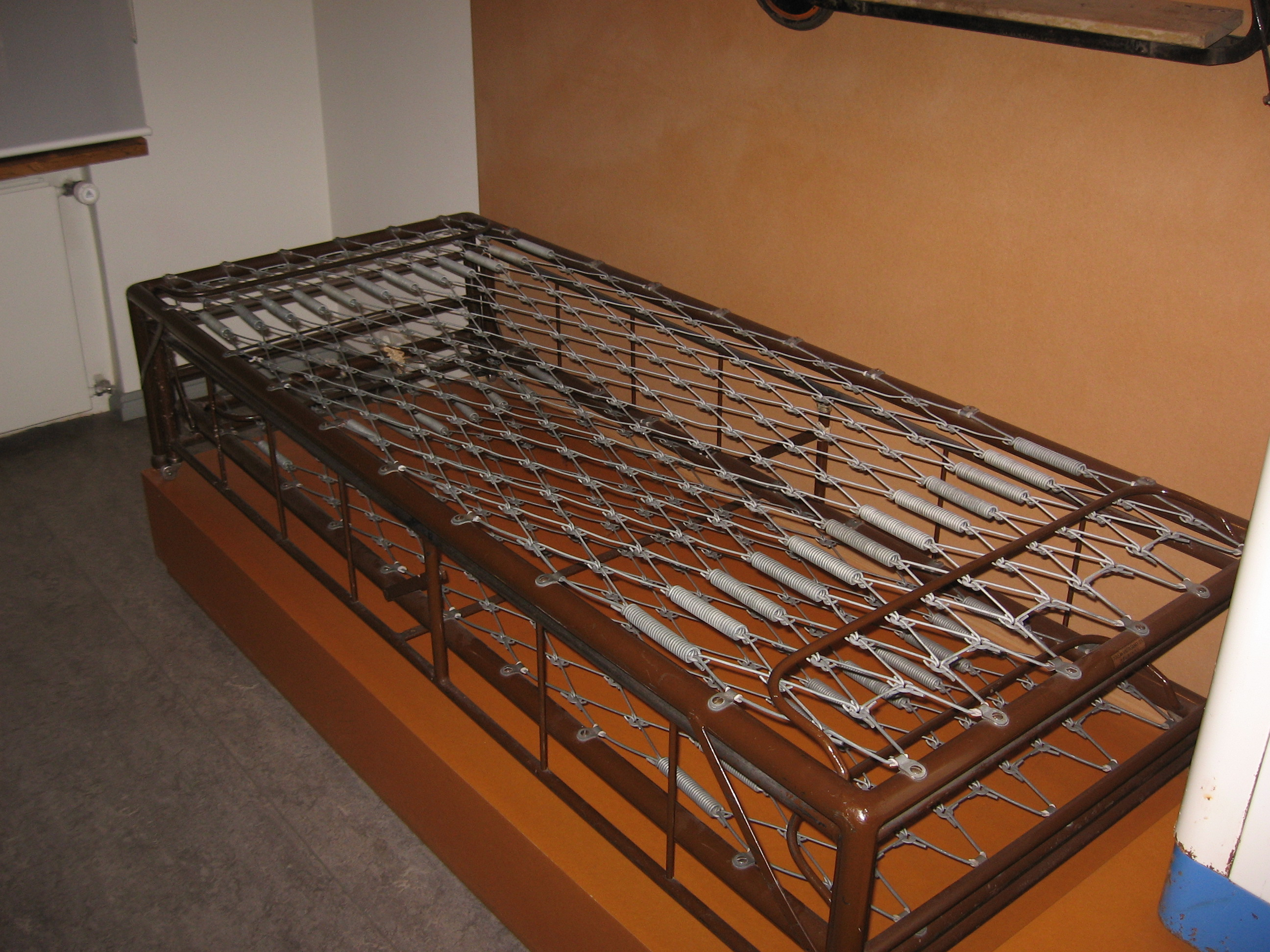
Longitudinal springs, with a wire net between them. Heteka model manufactured in Finland from 1932 to 1964

A grid-top foundation is a combination of steel and wood.

==== Box springs ====
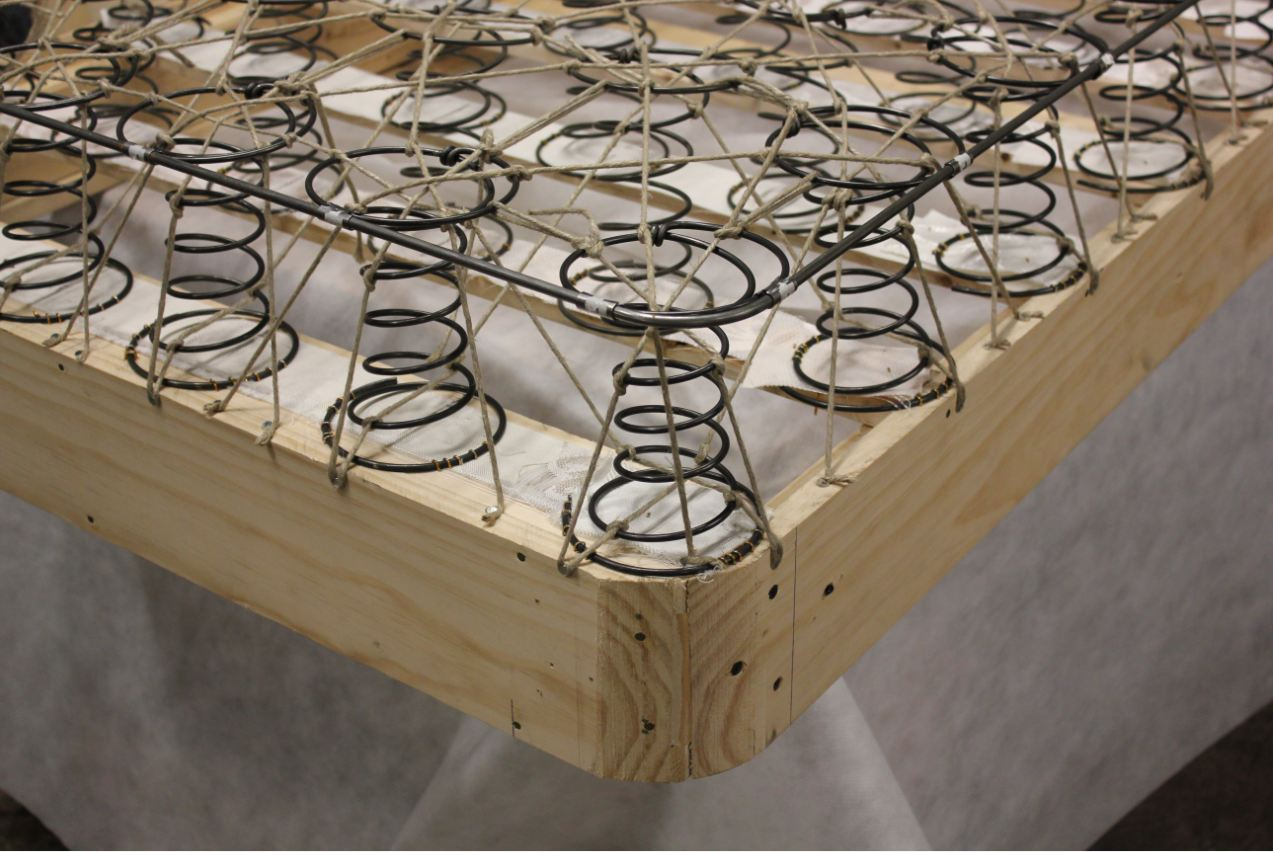
The corner of a boxspring, without its cloth covering. This boxspring has a wooden frame with wooden slats

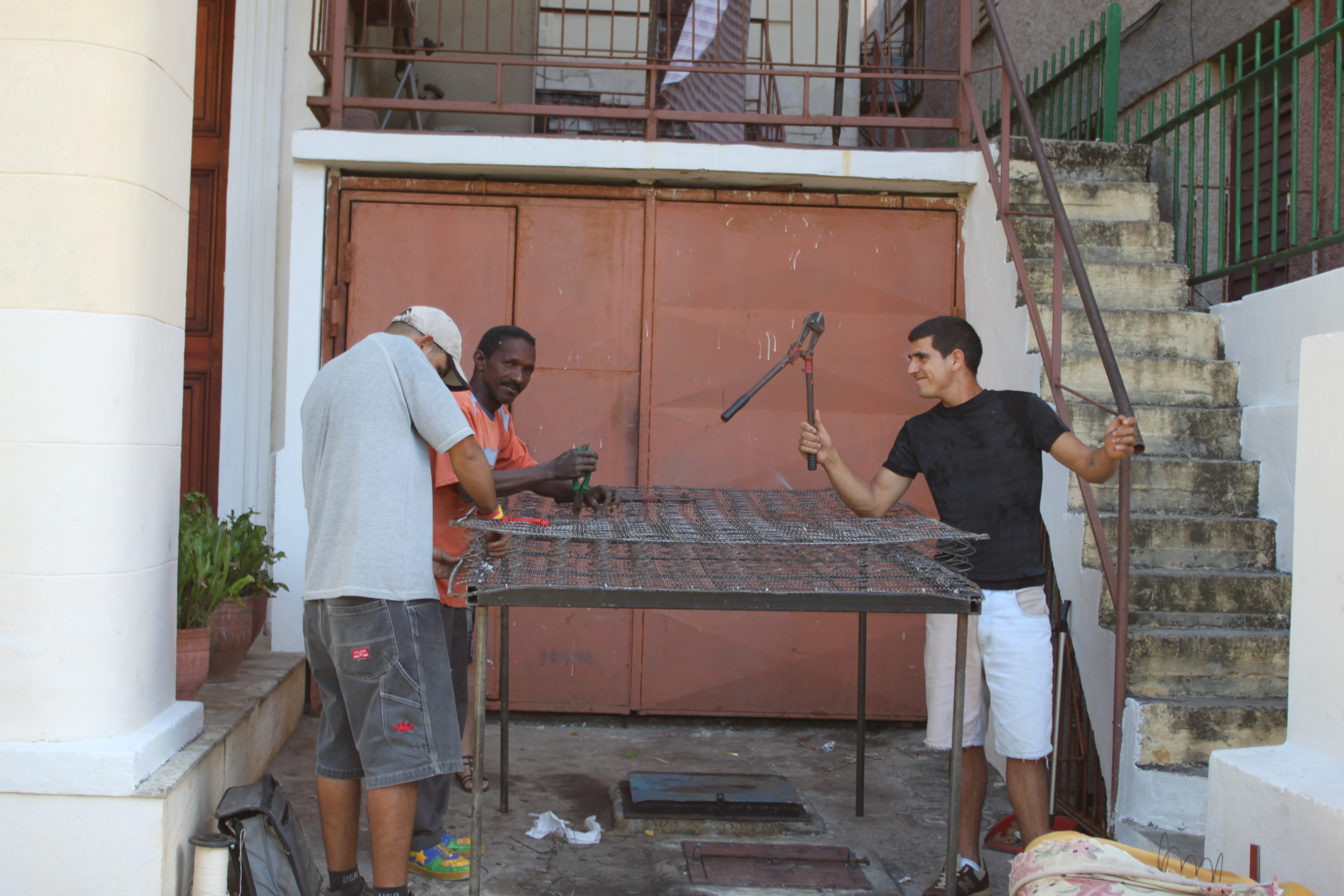
Repairing an all-metal boxspring in Cuba

A traditional box spring consists of a rigid frame containing extra heavy duty springs. This foundation is often paired with an innerspring mattress, as it extends the life of the spring unit at the mattress's core. Legs may be attached directly to the bottom of a boxspring, if it has a suitable frame, or the boxspring may be laid on a bedframe or another bed base.

In the US, box springs are sufficiently universal that any non-boxspring-bed is called a platform bed.
