= Tick mattress =

Type of bedding

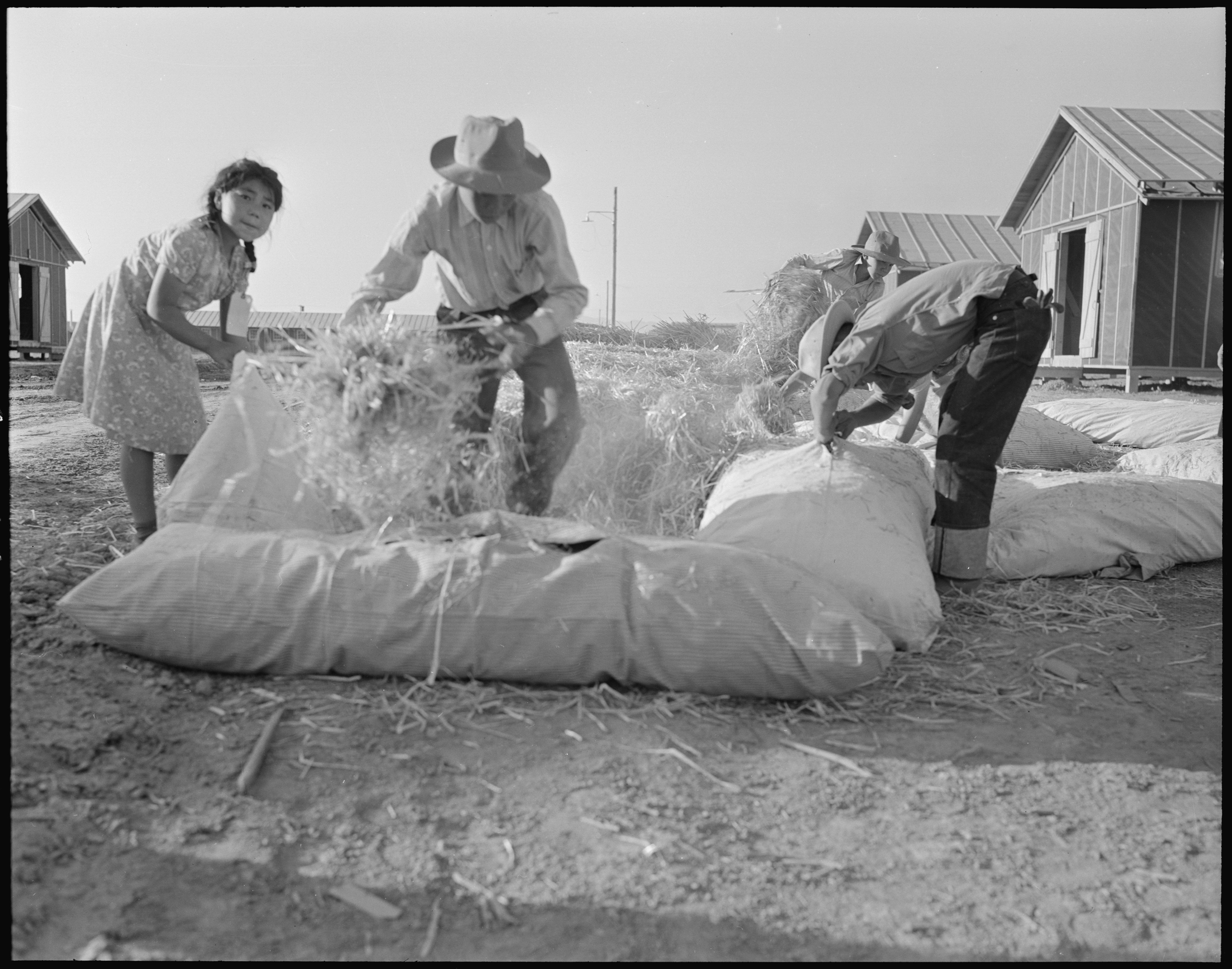
Ticks being filled with straw by Japanese-American internees at the Poston War Relocation Center in 1942

A tick mattress, bed tick or tick is a large bag made of strong, stiff, tightly-woven material (ticking). This is then filled to make a mattress, with material such as straw, chaff, horsehair, coarse wool or down feathers, and less commonly, leaves, grass, reeds, bracken, or seaweed. The whole stuffed mattress may also, more loosely, be called a tick. The tick mattress may then be sewn through to hold the filling in place, or the unsecured filling could be shaken and smoothed as the beds were aired each morning. A straw-filled bed tick is called a paillasse, palliasse, or pallet, and these terms may also be used for bed ticks with other fillings. A tick filled with flock (loose, unspun fibers, traditionally of cotton or wool) is called a flockbed. A feather-filled tick is called a featherbed, and a down-filled one is a downbed; these can also be used above the sleeper as a duvet.

A tick mattress (or a pile of such tick mattresses, softest topmost sheets, bedcovers, and pillows) was what Europeans traditionally called a "bed". The bedframe, when present, supported the bed but was not considered part of it.

== History ==
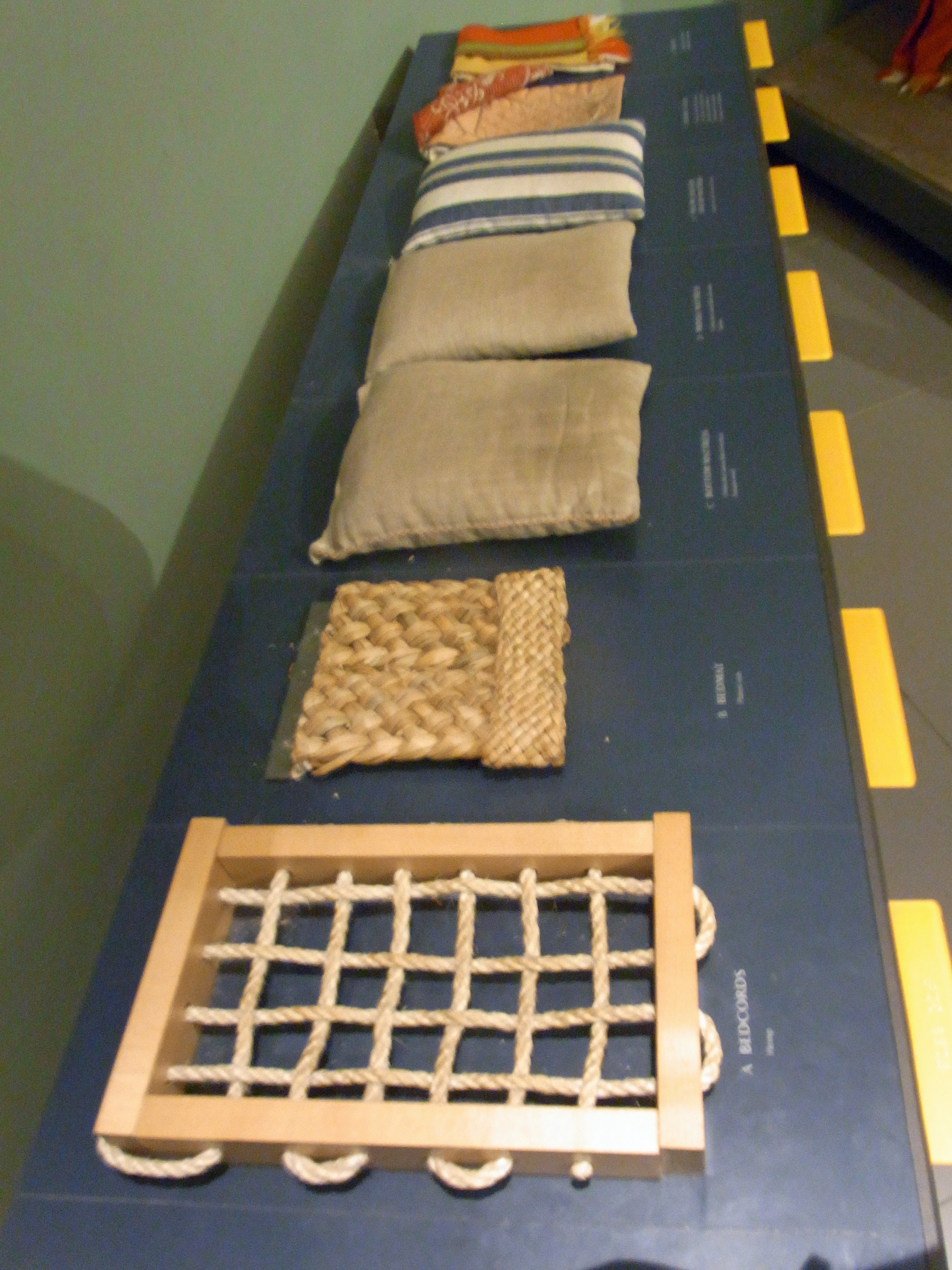
Touchable museum samples illustrating a 1590s bed: the bedcords, plaited-rush bedmat, a flockbed and a featherbed in dun ticking, a downbed in striped ticking, and the bedlinen

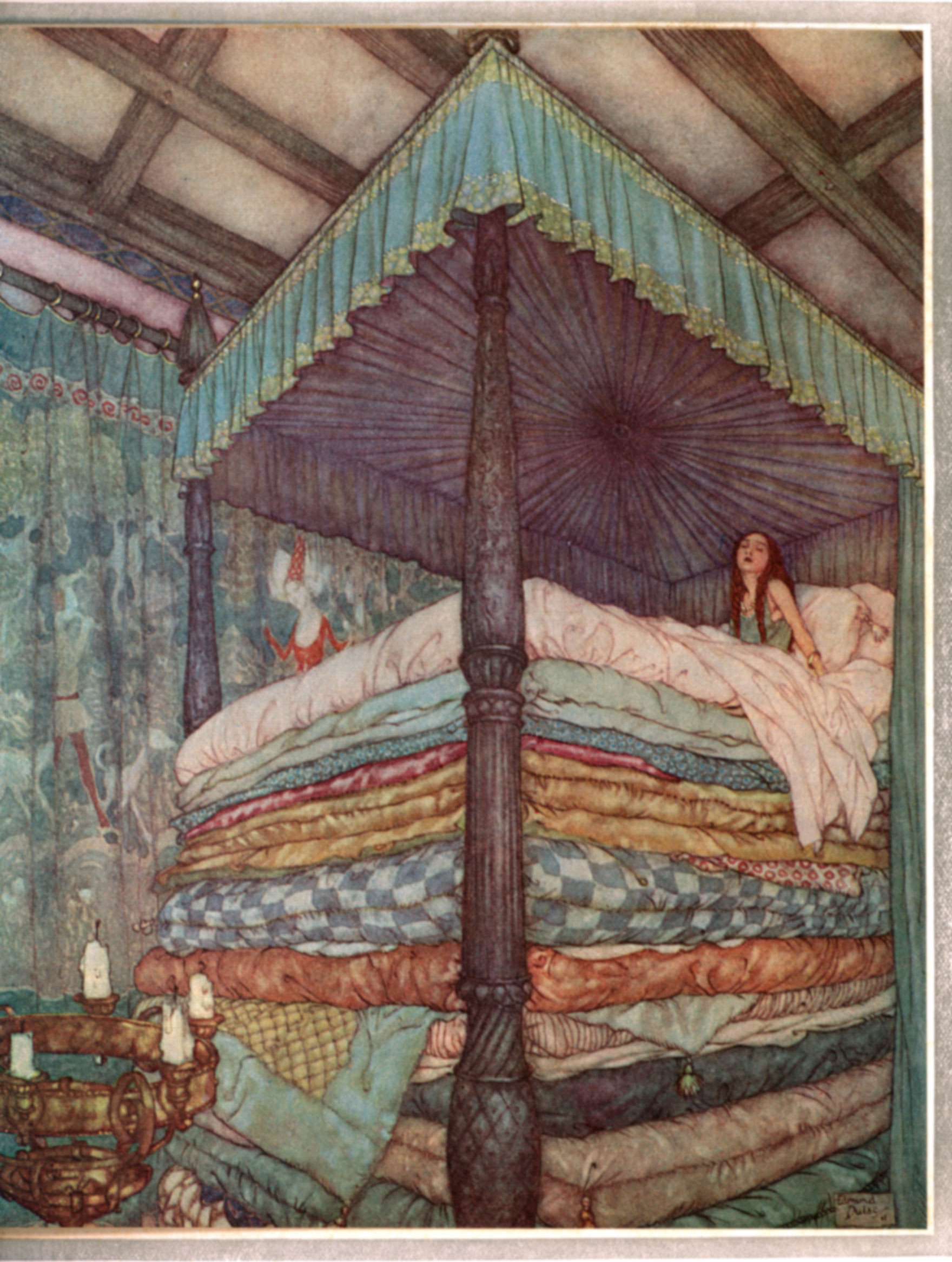
The fairytale The Princess and the Pea exaggerates the traditional European layering of tick mattresses.

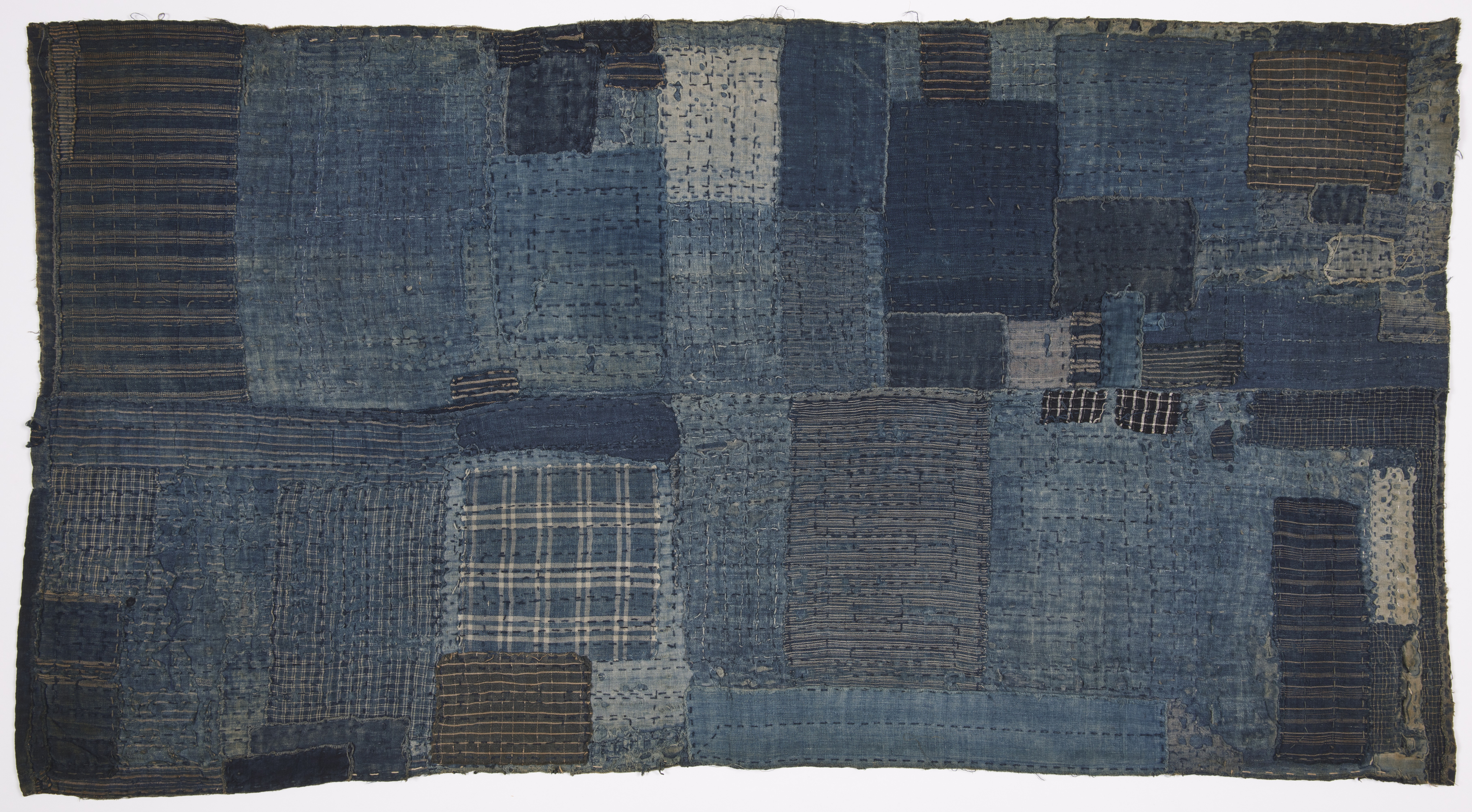
Child's shikibuton, late 1800s. Boroboro (patchwork) held together with over-all quilting stitching; see sashiko. Cotton.

In the fifteenth century, most people in Europe slept on straw, but wealthy people had featherbeds on top (for instance, Anne of Brittany's ladies-in-waiting slept on straw beds). By the nineteenth century, many people had feather beds.

If the pile of mattresses threatened to slide off the bed, in 16th- and 17th-century England, it was restrained with bedstaves, vertical poles thrust into the frame. A broad step might be placed alongside the bed as a place to sit and as a step up onto the pile of bedclothes.

Bedticks were often aired, often by hanging them outdoors, as bedding is still aired in parts of Europe and East Asia. In English-speaking cultures, however, airing bedding outdoors came to be seen as a foreign practice, with 19th-century housekeeping manuals giving methods of airing beds inside and disparaging airing them in the window as "German-style".

=== Stuffings ===
Straw and hay are cheap and abundant stuffings. The chaff of a local grain, be it rice chaff or oat chaff, is softer but less abundant. Reeds, bracken, seaweed, and esparto grass have also been used. Horsehair and flock make for firmer beds. Rags have also been used.

Before recycled cotton cloth was widely available in Japan, commoners slept upon kami busuma, stitched crinkled paper stuffed with fibers from beaten dry straw, cattails, or silk waste, on top of mushiro straw floor mats. Cotton was introduced from Korea in the 15th century but did not become widely available throughout Japan until the mid-eighteenth; commoners continued to rely on wild and cultivated bast fibers. Later, futon ticks were made with patchwork recycled cotton, quilted together and filled with bast fiber. Later still, they were filled with cotton, mattresses and coverlets both. Wool and synthetics are now also used.

Leaves can be used to fill ticks; they vary in quality by species and time of year. Chestnut leaves are prone to rustling and were called parliament beds in 17th-century France. Beech leaves were a quieter stuffing; if harvested in autumn before they were "much frostbitten", stayed soft and loose and did not become musty for seven or eight years, far longer than straw. Beech-leaf beds were also said to smell of green tea and crackle slightly, and be as soft as elastic as maize-husk beds.

Swapping out the stuffing was often done as materials became available seasonally. Travelers might carry ticks, but not the stuffing, buying whatever filling was cheap locally.

For expensive fillings, like feathers, the feathers would outlast the tick and be transferred into a new one when they poked through the old one. Featherbeds may be washed intact, or feathers and ticks can be cleaned separately. Since featherbeds were historically very valuable, and the feathers often took years to collect, they were not simply discarded and replaced. Indeed, they were taken along by migrants and mentioned in wills. Featherbeds were often made with feathers saved from poultry plucked for eating (servants were often allowed to keep the feathers they plucked). It took about 50 pounds (23 kg) to fill a tick. Goose and duck feathers were most valued (chicken feathers were undesirable), and down was softer and more valuable than other feathers.

== Tufting and quilting ==
To hold the filling in place, either sturdy individual securing stitches can be made through the tick and the filling (tufting), or the mattress can be quilted with lines of stitches. Both techniques are also used decoratively.

Individual tufting stitches for stronger materials and harder fillings are made with a stronger thread or twine. An extra-long upholstery needle may be needed to easily pass the thread through the tick. Sometimes, the stitches are finished with buttons on each side (often covered buttons).

Mattress quilting is done in a variety of patterns. Denser stitching makes the mattress firmer.

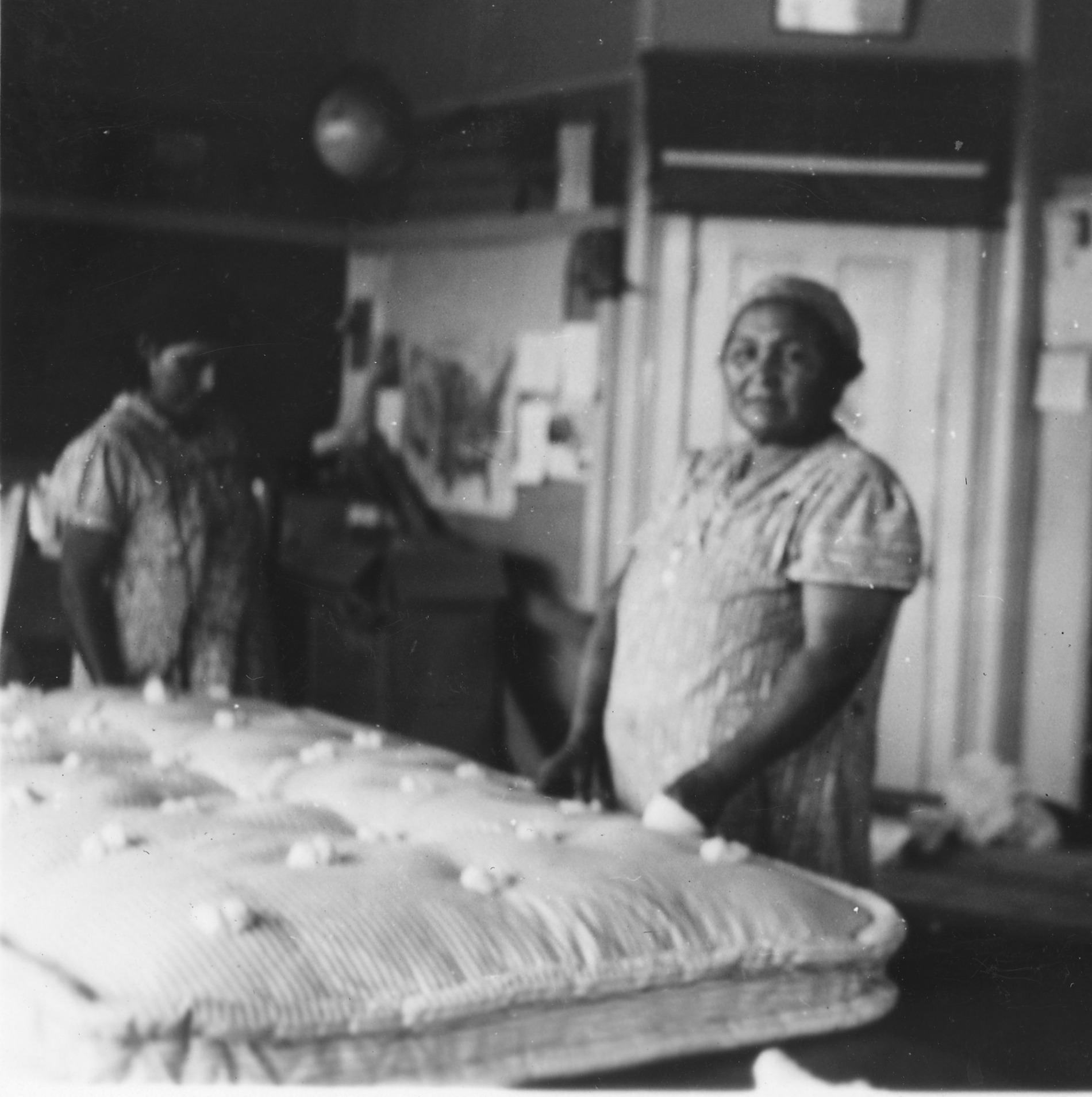
A tufted mattress, with through-stitches securing the filling

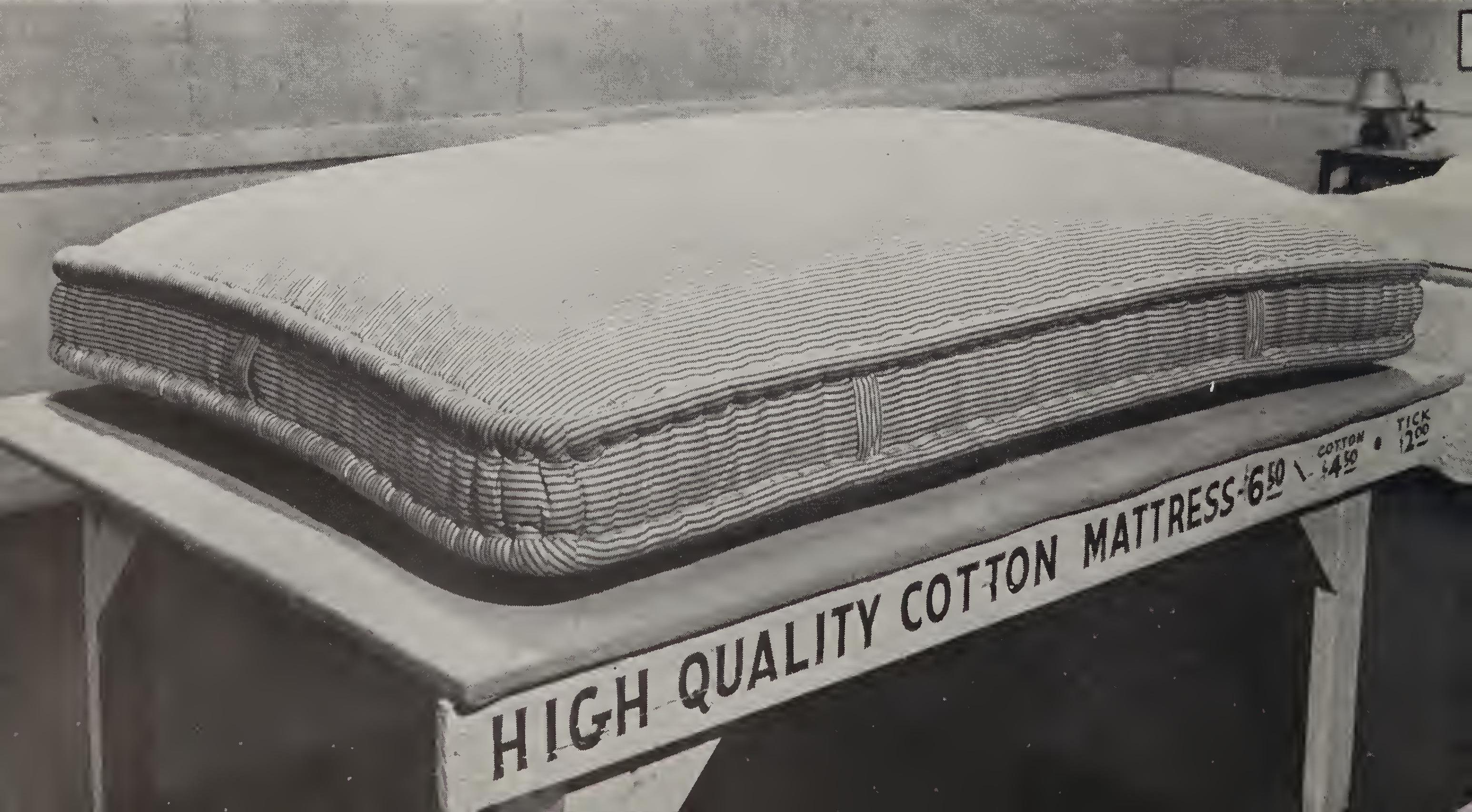
A similar untufted mattress

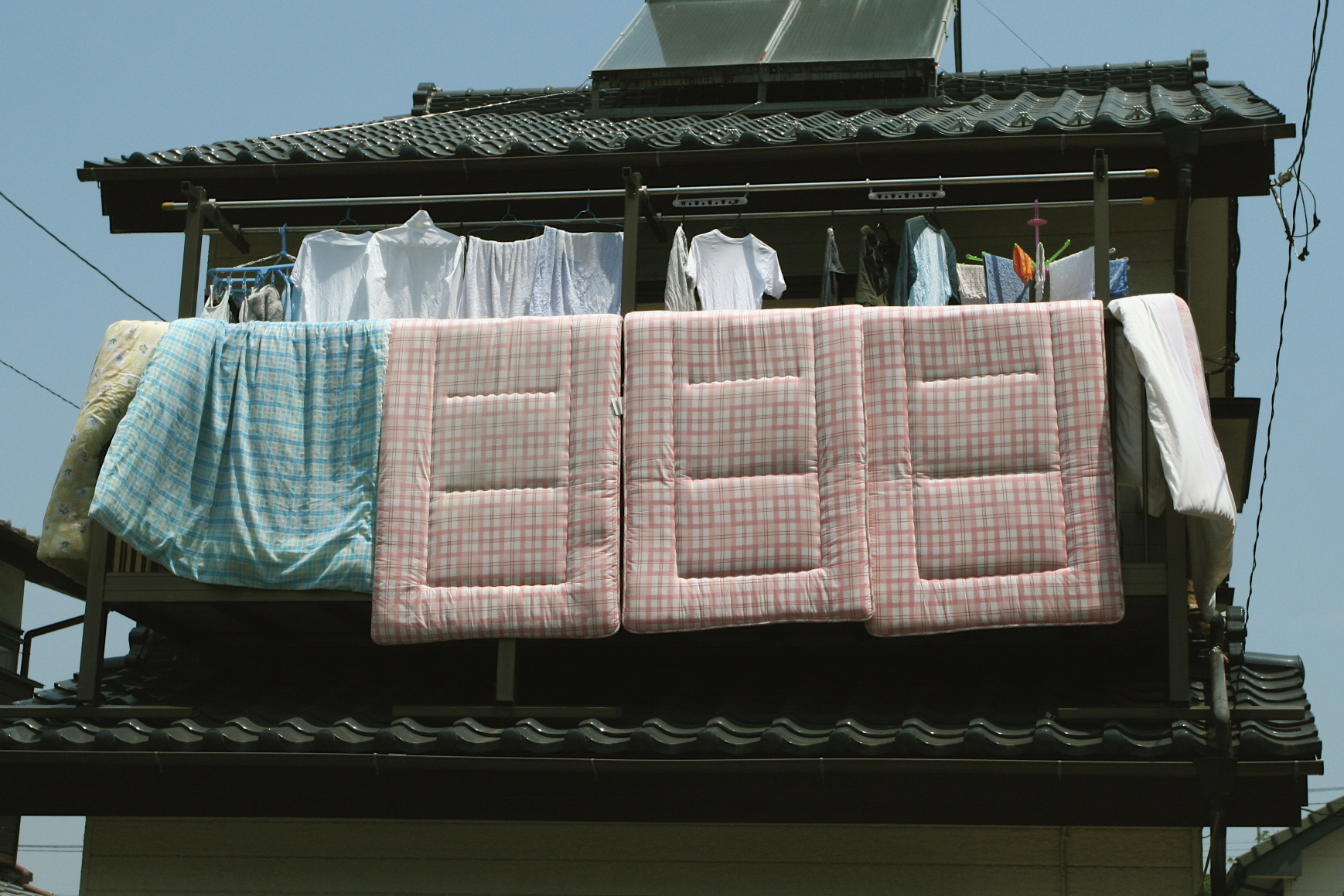
The pink tartan shikibutons are through-quilted; the green kakebutons may be quilted, but seem to still be in their covers.

== Unsewn ticking sheets ==
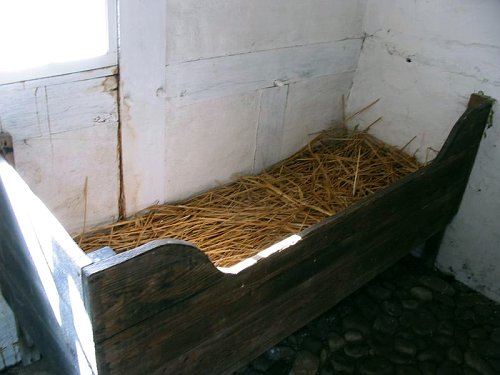
A bed filled with loose straw, but without the bedding, at a museum in Denmark

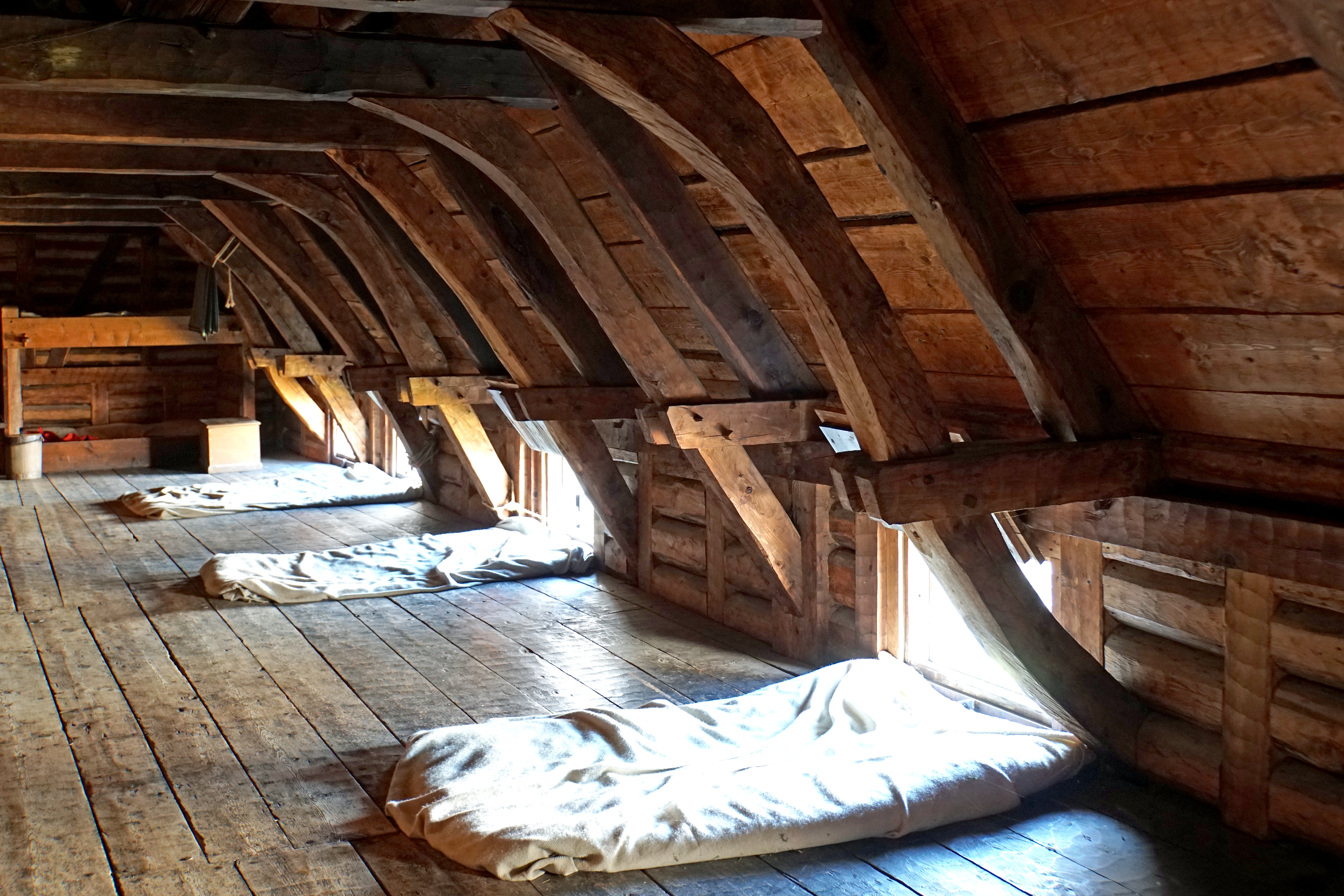
Basic straw mattresses in a loft in a historic site in Nova Scotia, Canada

The lowest layer might be covered with a length of ticking instead of stuffed into a tick, which made it easier to change. Henry VII of England's bed had a lower layer of loose straw:

The groom of the wardrobe brings in the loose straw and lays it reverently at the foot of the bed. The gentleman-usher draws back the curtains. Two squires stand by the bedhead and two yeomen of the guard at the foot. One of these, with the help of the yeomen of the chamber, carefully forms the truss, and rolls up and down on it to make it smooth and ensure that no dagger or such are hidden in it....A canvas is laid over the straw, then the feather-bed, which is smoothed with a bedstaff.

— Wright, Lawrence (1962). Warm & Snug:The History of the Bed. Routledge & K.Paul.

Such simple beds were also used as the only mattress.

"That is capital," said her grandfather; "now we must put on the sheet, but wait a moment first," and he went and fetched another large bundle of hay to make the bed thicker, so that the child should not feel the hard floor under her--"there, now bring it here." Heidi had got hold of the sheet, but it was almost too heavy for her to carry; this was a good thing, however, as the close thick stuff would prevent the sharp stalks of the hay running through and pricking her. The two together now spread the sheet over the bed, and where it was too long or too broad, Heidi quickly tucked it in under the hay. It looked now as tidy and comfortable a bed as you could wish for, and Heidi stood gazing thoughtfully at her handiwork.

"We have forgotten something now, grandfather," she said after a short silence.

"What's that?" he asked.

"A coverlid; when you get into bed, you have to creep in between the sheets and the coverlid."

"Oh, that's the way, is it? But suppose I have not got a coverlid?" said the old man.

"Well, never mind, grandfather," said Heidi in a consoling tone of voice, "I can take some more hay to put over me," and she was turning quickly to fetch another armful from the heap, when her grandfather stopped her. "Wait a moment," he said, and he climbed down the ladder again and went towards his bed. He returned to the loft with a large, thick sack, made of flax, which he threw down, exclaiming, "There, that is better than hay, is it not?"

Heidi began tugging away at the sack with all her little might, in her efforts to get it smooth and straight, but her small hands were not fitted for so heavy a job. Her grandfather came to her assistance, and when they had got it tidily spread over the bed, it all looked so nice and warm and comfortable that Heidi stood gazing at it in delight.

— Spyri, Johanna (1881). Heidi. Translated by an unspecified translator (Project Gutenberg ebook 1448 ed.)., a novel

== See also ==
- Futons, Japanese tick mattresses
