= Protect-A-Bed =

Bedding products company

Protect-A-Bed®
- Industry: Retail, Bedding
- Headquarters: United States, Australia, and more...
- Products: Mattress protection products
- Website: www.protect-a-bed.com

Protect-A-Bed® is a manufacturer and distributor of bedding products (including mattress protectors, encasements, and pillows) that help protect against bed bugs, dust and allergens. Protect-A-Bed products are available in 45 countries. Protect-A-Bed supplies mattress and pillow protectors to 7 of the 11 top bedding specialists in the United States, several of the top 100 U.S. furniture chains, and all the major distributors in the pest control industry and hospitality industry. Protect-A-Bed products are also sold by national retailers including Target, Kohl's, and Costco. The company currently has in excess of 7,000 furniture and bedding store clients in the United States as well as serving pest control and hospitality markets with bedding protection products. Protect-A-Bed is the developer of Miracle Membrane®, a proprietary membrane, which is waterproof and protects against liquids, as well as the patented BugLock® with SecureSeal® and three-sided zipper system for encasements. Protect-A-Bed products are listed as Class 1 Medical Devices with the Food and Drug Administration (Malaysia), and have received the Good Housekeeping Seal.

== History ==
Protect-A-Bed's mattress protector was originally developed and introduced in South Africa in 1980 under the name SnugFit. Protect-A-Bed was incorporated in 2000 to distribute unique waterproof mattress protectors in the United States. By 2003, the business had grown to revenues in excess of $3.5 million and was represented in 40 states. Early in 2004, Protect-A-Bed established operations in Chicago to further facilitate the growing distribution needs in the United States.

== 2011 to present ==
Protect-A-Bed moved its corporate headquarters from Northbrook, Illinois to Wheeling, IL in the summer of 2011.

iPhone and Android app that launched in early 2011, called Bed Bugs 101, to serve as a mobile consumer reference guide on bed bugs. In July 2011, Protect-A-Bed released an iPhone game called Bed Bug Plague, that serves as an interactive bed bug elimination game.

Protect-A-Bed was acquired by SureFit Home Decor, an Alburtis, Pennsylvania-based textiles supplier, in 2018. Protect-A-Bed was acquired by Keeco, LLC, a Hayward, California-based supplier, in 2021.

== Overseas markets ==
Protect-A-Bed operates offices around the world in the United Kingdom, Australia, New Zealand, Canada, China, South Africa, Norway, Costa Rica, Nicaragua, El Salvador, Honduras, Guatemala, Brazil, Colombia, Ecuador, Panama, Malaysia, Indonesia, Singapore, Korea, United Arab Emirates, Oman, Saudi Arabia, Qatar, Kuwait, and the Caribbean. The Protect-A-Bed product is represented by distributors in 45 countries across the world, including a joint venture in China, Hong Kong and Taiwan, and more recently, opening a distribution in India, Russia and Singapore.
