= Mattress pad =

Thin mattress serving as protection

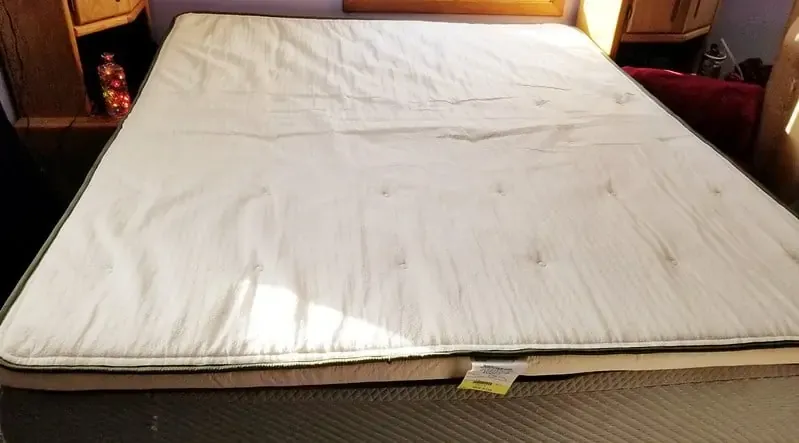
A mattress topper on a boxspring mattress

A mattress pad, mattress topper, or underpad is a large, thin cushion designed to lie atop a mattress. Made from a variety of materials including wool, cotton, memory foam, feather and latex, its function is to provide an extra layer of comfort, especially when the existing mattress is worn or uncomfortable.

Physically, it is a thin mattress, usually 5–10 centimetres (2–4 in) thick. Stand-alone mattresses of this size exist, including futons, and floor beds. Similarly, traditional European beds were made of a stack of mattresses of this size. In contrast, mattress toppers are usually sold for use on top of boxsprings (secured with straps or elasticated cloth corners). They are used to extend the life of the more-expensive boxspring, make a bed warmer or cooler (with airflow, or heat-conductive materials), make a firm bed softer, and for travel and dorms, as they are portable, especially if they are low-density.

Like a mattress protector/mattress pad/mattress cover (a thin, generally unpadded layer not designed to improve comfort), mattress toppers can be used to protect the mattress from the sleeper or vice versa. Some mattress toppers are machine-washable; covers and fillings are made from a range of materials.

== Common types of mattress toppers ==
=== Pillow-top mattress toppers ===
Pillow top mattress toppers are filled with natural fibers such as cotton or down, or synthetic options such as microfiber. The filling is usually segmented into pockets which help it to stay in place. This is similar to quilts, though mattress toppers are usually 4 inches (10 cm) or thicker. Most hotel beds use this type of topper, which gives them their plush feel. Eggshell mattress toppers claim to extend the life of an older bed.

=== Memory-foam mattress toppers ===
Visco-elastic foam toppers are made from visco-elastic polyurethane, also known as "memory foam", a type of material that exhibits both viscous and elastic characteristics when undergoing deformation. Viscous materials, like water, resist shear flow and strain linearly with time when a stress is applied. The foam used in the construction of memory foam toppers reacts to both pressure and temperature. This, combined with its greater density, are properties that give them their characteristic "weightlessness" sensation. Memory foam mattress toppers are touted to optimize support and promote proper spinal alignment during sleep. They are also regularly used in medical institutions to relieve pressure.

=== Latex mattress toppers ===
Latex is derived from rubber tree sap and feels springy as well as responsive. There are 2 main methods of manufacturing latex:

==== Dunlop Latex ====
Dunlop latex is heavier on one side than the other due to sedimentation during the foaming process. As such, it is primarily used for support layers of a bed.

==== Tatalay Latex ====
Tataly Latex is flash frozen, which results in a lighter, fluffier foam. It lacks support and is used primarily as a comfort layer.

=== Others ===
An electric mattress pad is made of heavy fabric with heating filaments woven into it. In the UK and Commonwealth countries this is called an "electric blanket".

== See also ==
- Futon
- Bed base
- Tick mattress
