= Mattress protector =

Bedding product

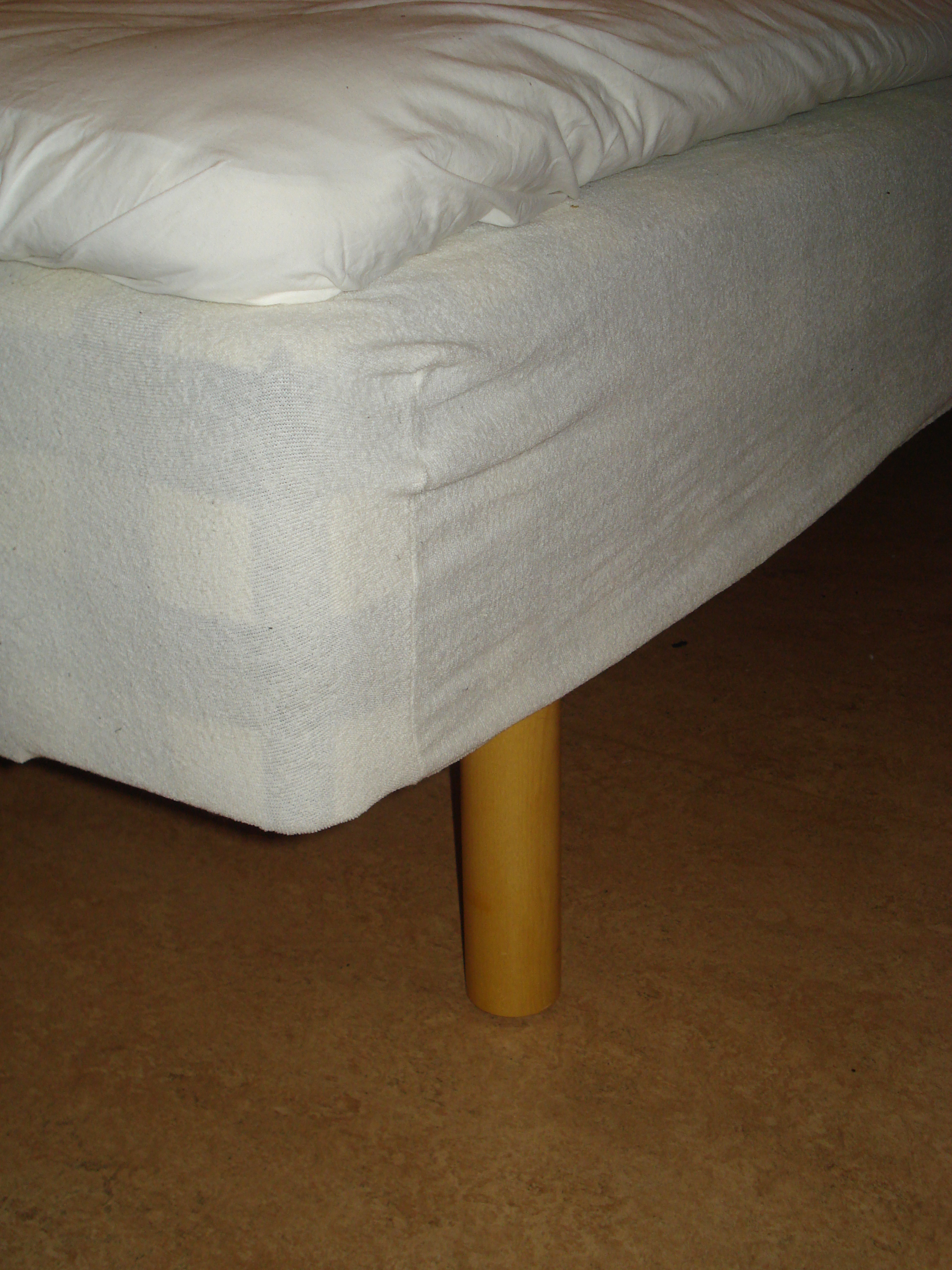
A mattress protector with elastic on top of a bed base

A mattress protector (also mattress cover, mattress pad may mean this or a mattress topper) is an item of removable bedding that sits on top of, or encases, a mattress to protect it. Some mattress protectors also provide protection to the person sleeping on the mattress from allergens and irritants such as dust mites, bed bugs, mold, and dead skin (like dandruff).

== Protecting the mattress ==
Although the surface of a mattress can be cleaned with a vacuum cleaner, it is very difficult to completely clean most standard mattresses. An unprotected mattress can become marked or stained quite quickly as perspiration produced throughout the night easily passes through a standard cloth sheet and creates a characteristic yellowish-brown tidemark where it's absorbed into the upper surface of the mattress. Mattresses are also susceptible to many other contaminants.

The simplest form of a mattress protector is a lightly quilted fitted sheet. It provides minimal protection against liquids and little or no protection from dust mite allergens.

In addition to conventional natural fabrics, new forms of synthetic protector or topper have appeared over the years including memory foam and spacer fabrics. These are more expensive than conventional protectors but add the advantages of pressure relief and in the case of the latter, the ability to be washed.

Waterproof mattress protectors keep the mattress clean by securing it from absorbing body excretions (such as sweat) or other liquids resulting from spills. These can take the form of flat rubberized flannel pads (commonly used under a bedsheet for infants) or special breathable fitted covers. The plastic pads are hot to sleep on and change the feel of the mattress. A urethane laminate on cotton that has good wicking properties is an alternative to a rubberized flannel pad. A protector with a thin laminate that is not pulled too tightly across the bed will not change the feel of the bed. Also, the laminate is still breathable which means that it will not trap body heat.

Most mattress warranties are voided if the mattress gets a stain, so most sleepers use mattress pads to prevent stains.

== Protecting the health of the sleeper ==
The use of a mattress protector is often recommended to individuals who are known to be susceptible to certain kinds of allergies, especially dust mites. Dust mites produce waste products that irritate the lining of the airways and lungs and particularly with children can bring on allergic reactions, asthma and can irritate skin conditions such as eczema. A full zippered encasement allergen filtration mattress protector can provide an extra layer of protection between the user and their mattress, filtering allergens that are known to trigger allergy and asthma symptoms.

For protection against bed bugs, the mattress and box spring must both be fully enclosed with no possible openings. Zippered cases are commonly used for this purpose. This prevents new bed bugs from getting into the mattress and box spring, and traps any bed bugs that are already inside. Mattress protectors must be left on for at least a full year to make sure that the trapped bed bugs and their eggs die. If the cover is taken off early, the bed bug infestation may relapse.

Waterproof mattress protectors also reduce allergy symptoms by reducing the ability of mold to grow in a mattress. Mattress protectors which can be easily disinfected are commonly used in children's nurseries and health care facilities.

A 2002 Norwegian study has found that foam mattresses are 4 to 8 times more likely to host dust mite feces than spring mattresses.

== Types ==
=== Encasements ===
Encasements are designed to fully "encase" all six sides of a mattress and will often have a zipper closure. Encasements are often used in hotels as the full encasement and zipper closure provides a high level of protection against bed bugs.

=== Sheet-style ===
Mattress protectors may also come in a fitted sheet style, covering only five sides of the mattress. This style is used to protect the mattress from liquid damage (e.g. bedwetting) and/or to reduce exposure to allergens.

== Disposable underpads ==
In hospital or other medical settings, a disposable underpad may be used to absorb blood and other bodily fluid, in concert with a hospital gown. This is sometimes light blue and known as chux pad, after an old brand name for a disposable diaper.

== See also ==
- Futon (of similar dimensions to a mattress topper)
- Bed base
- Polyurethane
- Bed skirt
