= Airing =

Method of drying fabrics

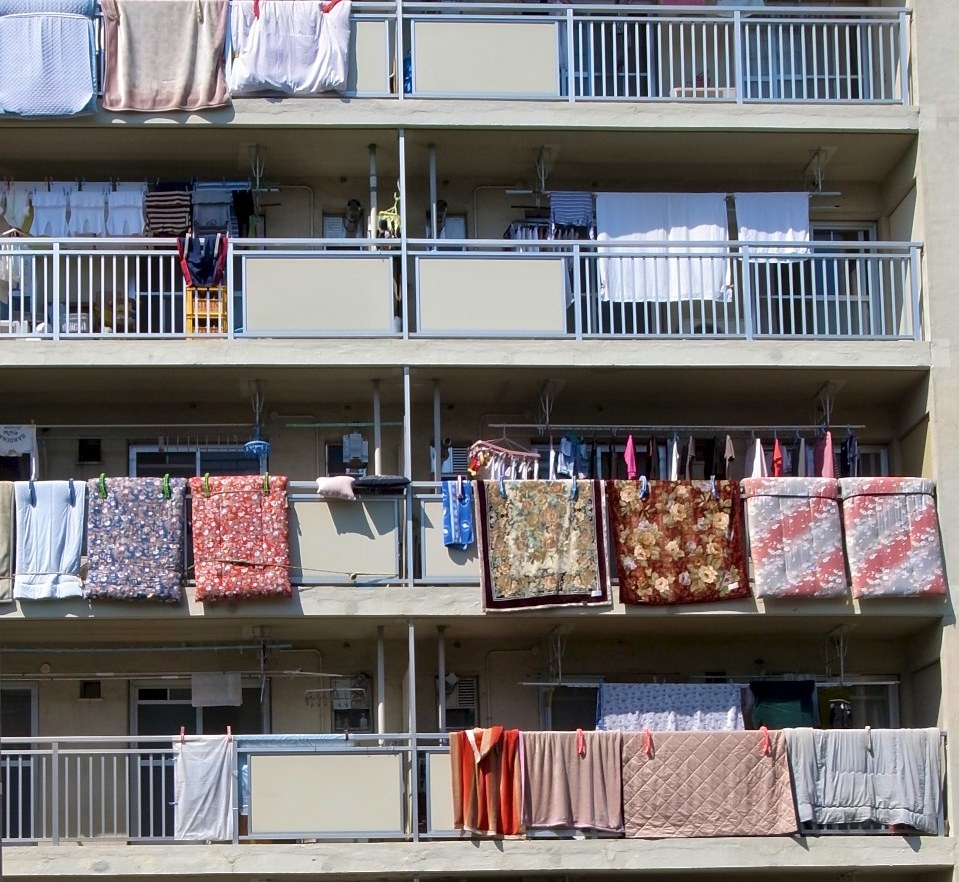
Airing futons (of both the quilt and mattress variety) in Japan. Note specialized railing clips

Airing is the practice of hanging or laying out articles and exposing them to air, and sometimes heat and light. This practice is commonly used to dry many types of fabric. One of the most common methods of drying using airing is the clothesline. It consists of a thin wire from which clothing pieces and bedsheets (among others) are hung, using pegs or simply laying the article over the line.

== Reasons ==
Air contains water vapour; warm air can hold more water than cold air. If the temperature of air drops past its dew point, the water will condense out. The dew point is the point where the relative humidity reaches 100%, and the air becomes supersaturated with water.

If water condenses on pieces of equipment, it can cause rot, mould, mildew, and other deterioration. To prevent this, they are brought out into the open, and unsaturated air is circulated around them to dry them out. Some extant mildew can be killed by airing for several hours before vacuuming the cloth.

In a building with forced-air heating, the air is brought in from the outside and warmed, so the indoor relative humidity is lowered. In cold weather, the relative humidity inside such a building will be very low, and airing will not be as important. In warmer climates where heating is less-used, condensation is more likely to be a problem. As exhaled breath is at about 100% humidity, breathing in a room will encourage condensation.

A human body heats and humidifies clothing it is wearing. Airing clothing after wearing dries it out again.

Airing is used to reduce smells and allow clothing to be washed less frequently. Reduced microbial growth aside, a common source of smells is volatile organic compounds. As they are volatile, they will tend to evaporate into the air when articles are aired.

Airing outdoors is best done when the outdoor humidity is lower, often between 10:00 a.m. and 3:00 p.m., midmorning to midafternoon. Airing for a few hours will prolong the life of fabric, but airing for too long in strong light can damage it.

== Equipment ==
Clothing is often hung to air in a clothesline or clotheshorse, outdoors in dry weather, and indoors in wet. An overhead clothes airer may be used to save space.

Delicate textiles are aired lying flat, in dim or shaded areas, to avoid fading the colours or weakening the fibers. A plastic sheet covered with a clean sheet, laid outdoors in the shade, can be used to air delicate items that can't be hung.

A drying cover, a thin, dark-coloured, breathable cloth, is sometimes used to protect articles from the sun while heating and drying them in the sun.

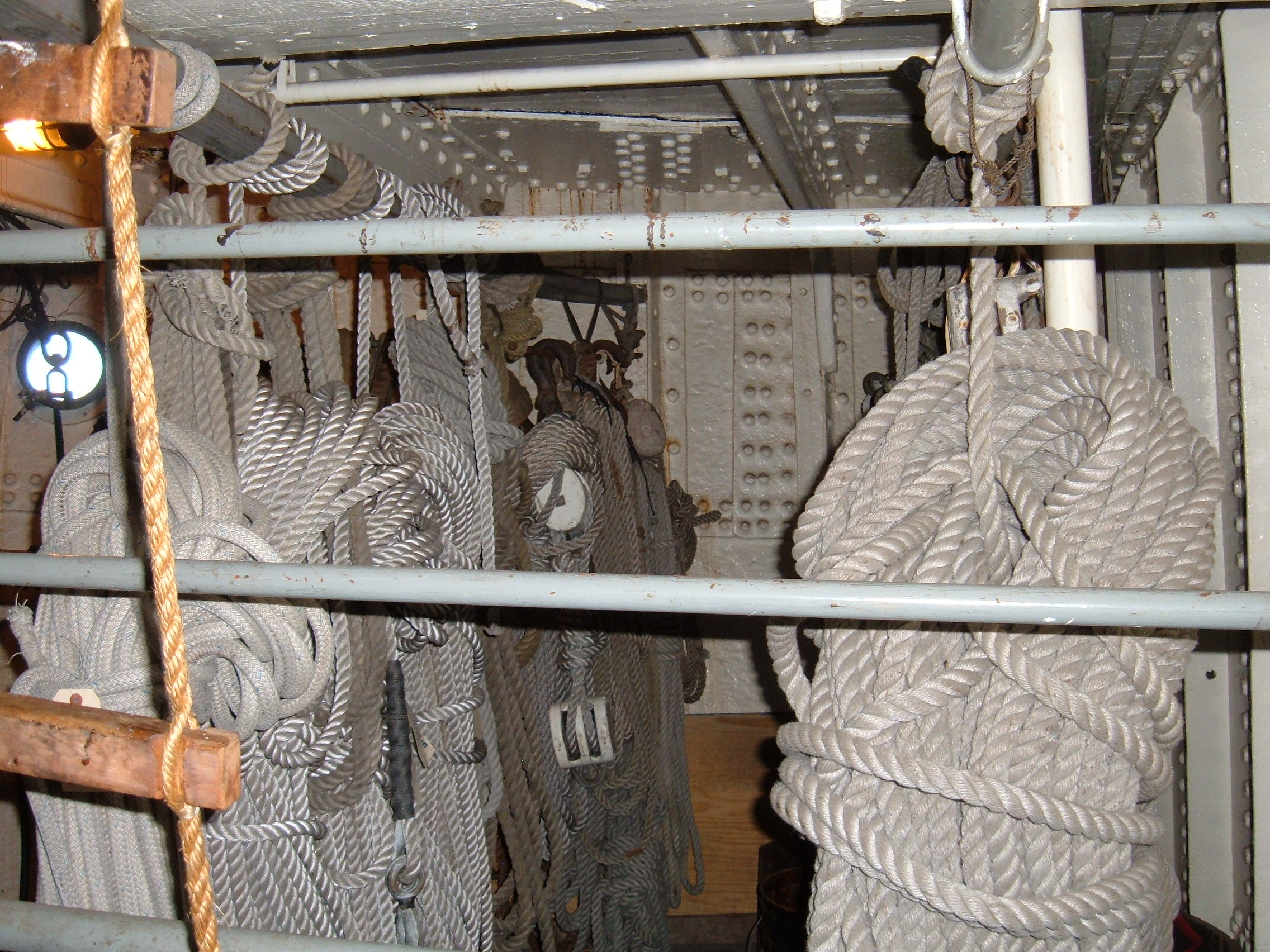
A hanging locker in an 1863 ship, for airing lines

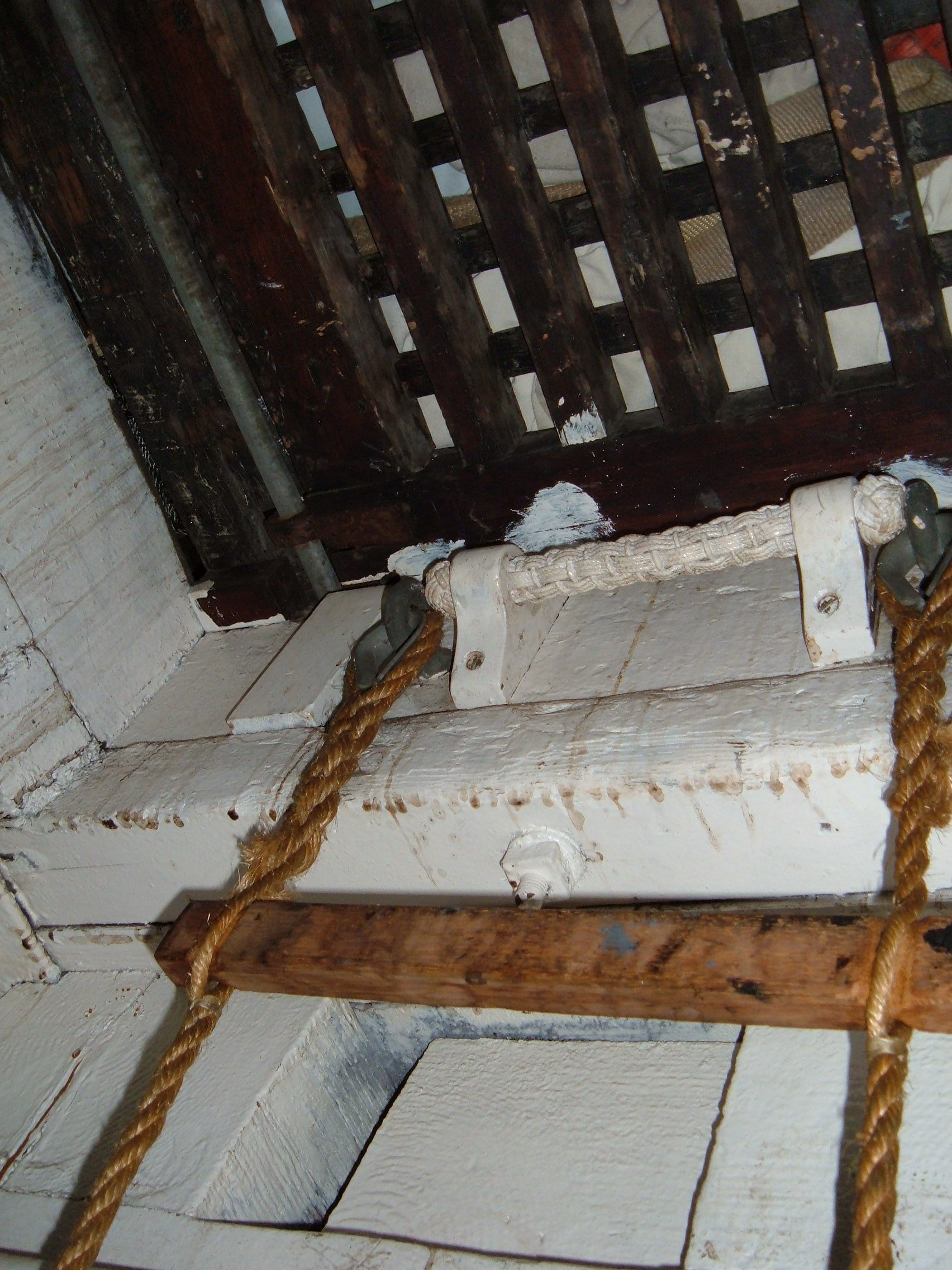
...a wooden grating overhead allows air circulation.

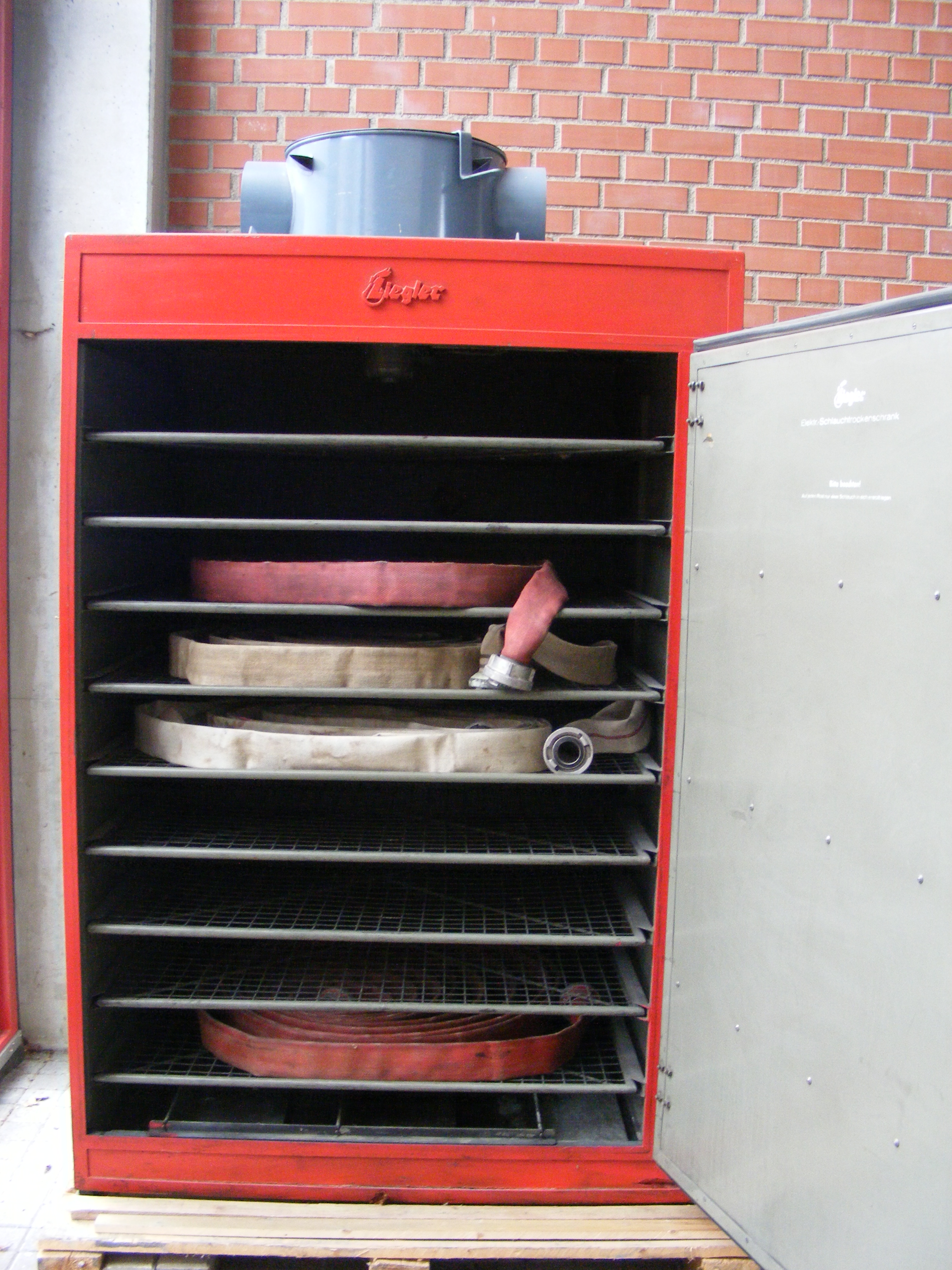
A drying cabinet for firefighting hoses

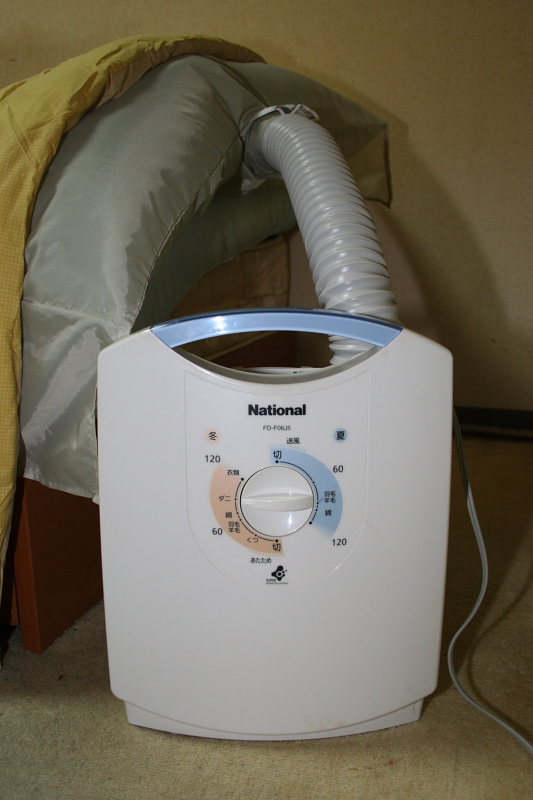
An electric futon dryer airs a futon in-situ

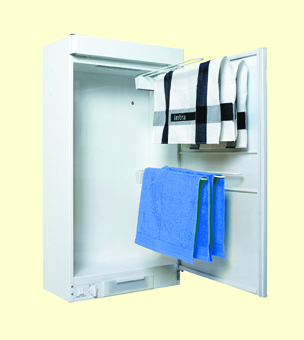
A small electrically heated drying cabinet

An external heating source allows items to be aired inside even in damp weather, but costs energy, especially if the hot air leaves too rapidly, before absorbing much moisture. A drying cabinet heats a confined space in which items are hung, or shelved on slatted shelves, so the air can circulate; the leakiness of the cabinet can usually be adjusted. Aboard ship, a heated hanging locker fills a similar role. An airing cupboard often uses waste heat from an appliance (such as a water heater) to dry items on rods or slatted shelves.

In climates where indoor humidity tends to rise too high and promote mould, airing cupboards may have separate ventilation.

== Items ==
Western bedding may be aired for an hour or more after waking, by throwing the covers back or hanging them over the foot of the bed and/or a chair, to reduce mould, mites, and stale smells.

Futons get musty, mouldy, and infested by mites if not aired regularly. The frequency of airing needed depends on the type of futon. Traditionally they are aired by hanging outside, but where this is not possible a futon dryer is used. Airing them also fluffs them up, making them more comfortable to sleep on.

In the Arctic, furs are aired outside in good weather, especially in spring.
