= Futon =

Traditional Japanese bedding

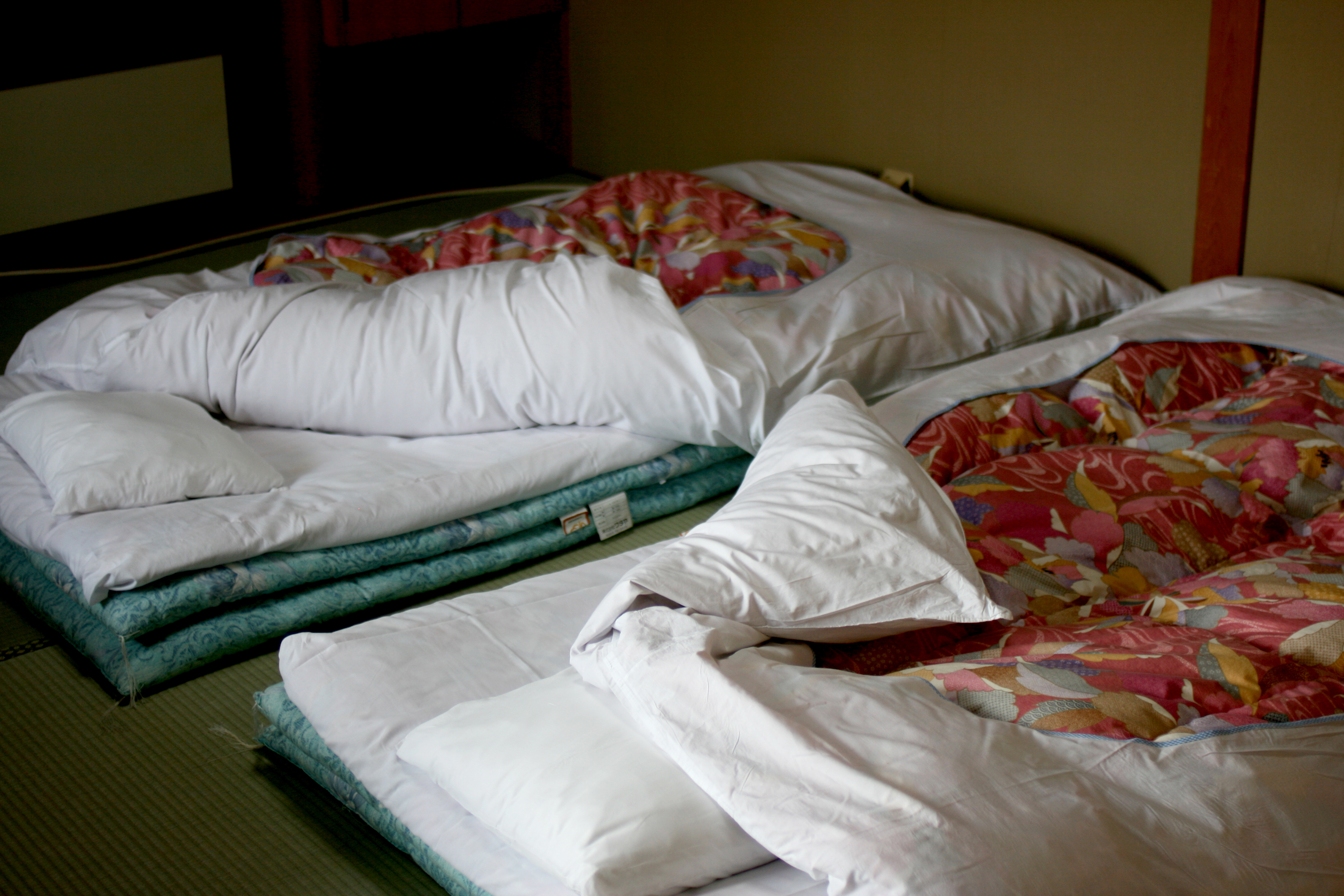
Japanese-style futons laid out for sleeping in a ryokan (inn). In green, three shikibutons per bed; in red, turned-back kakebutons. The top two futons in each stack are covered in white fitted sheets, matching the pillowslips.

A futon (布団) is a traditional Japanese style of bedding.

A complete futon set consists of a mattress (敷き布団, shikibuton; lit. "spreading futon") and a duvet (掛け布団, kakebuton; lit. "covering futon"). Both elements of a futon bedding set are pliable enough to be folded and stored away in a large closet (押入れ, oshiire) during the day. This allows a room to serve as a bedroom at night, but serve other purposes during the day.

Traditionally, futons are used on tatami, a type of mat used as a flooring material. It also provides a softer base than wooden or stone floors. Futons must be aired regularly to prevent mold from developing, and to keep the futon free of mites. Throughout Japan, futons can commonly be seen hanging over balconies, airing in the sun. Futon dryers may be used by those unable to hang out their futon.

== History and materials ==
Before recycled cotton cloth was widely available in Japan, commoners used kami busuma, stitched crinkled paper stuffed with fibers from beaten dry straw, cattails, or silk waste, on mushiro straw floor mats. Later, futons were made with patchwork recycled cotton, quilted together and filled with bast fiber. Later they were filled with cotton. Wool and synthetics are now also used.

Yogi (夜着, literally "nightclothes") are kimono-shaped bedclothes. They were used in the 1800s and early 1900s. Rectangular kakebutons are now widely used. Kakebutons vary in materials; some are warmer than others. Those with traditional cotton filling feel heavier than those with feather or synthetic fillings.

Traditional makura (まくら) are generally firmer than western pillows. They may be filled with beans, buckwheat chaff, bran, or, modernly, plastic beads, all of which mold to the head. Historically, some women used wooden headrests to protect their hairstyles.

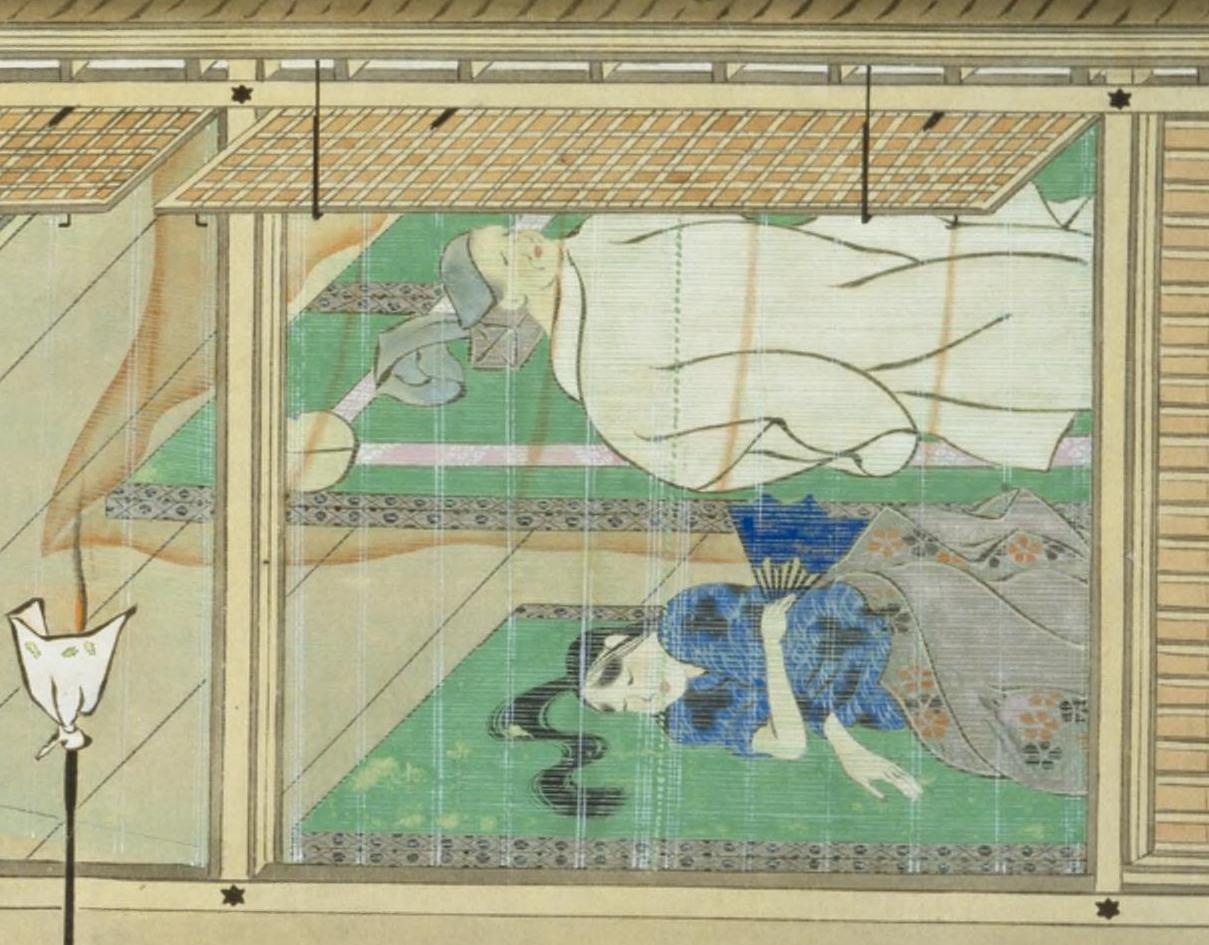
Sleeping on tatami, with no futon, and clothes used as coverings. Early 14th century

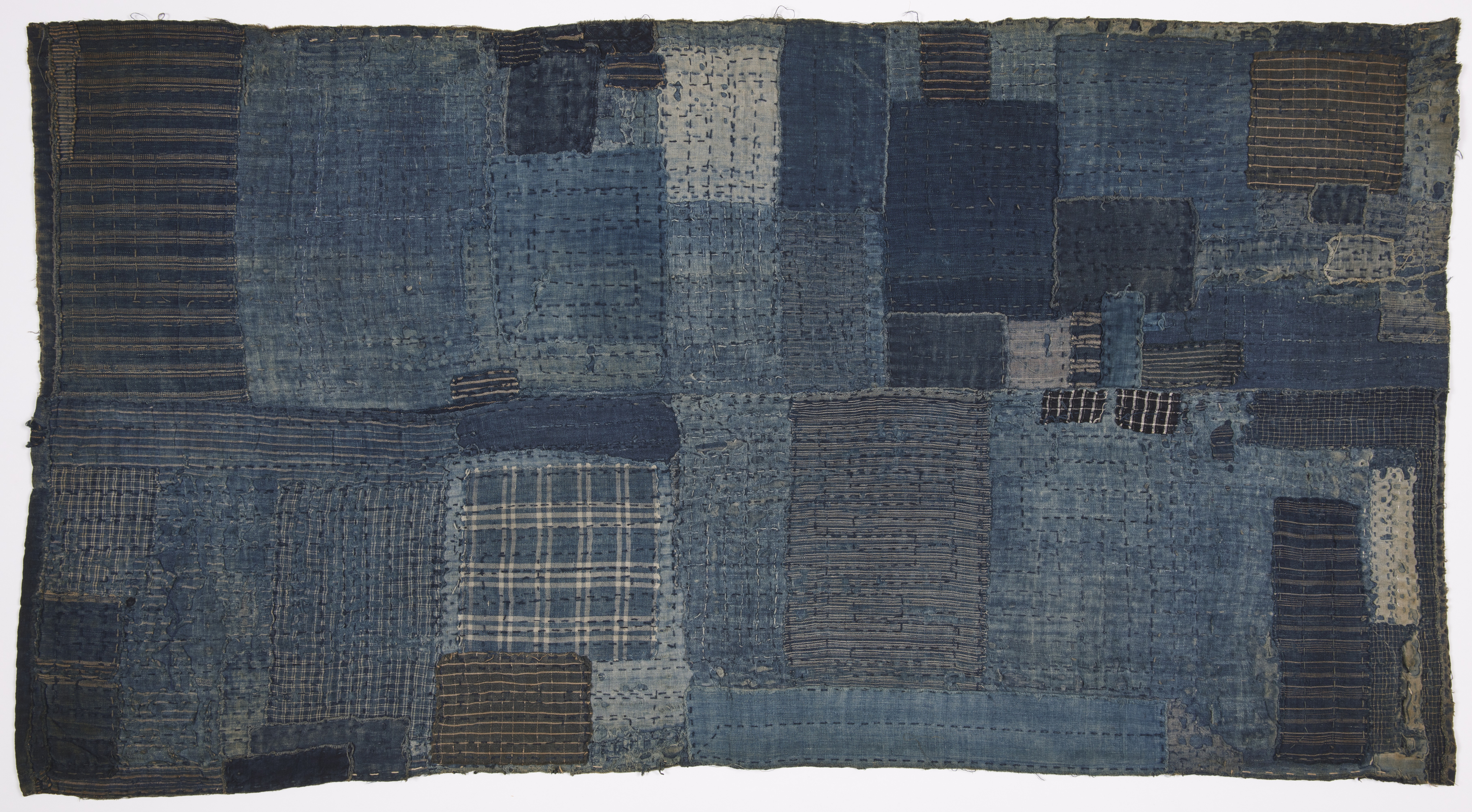
Child's shikibuton, late 1800s. Boroboro (patchwork) held together with over-all quilting stitching; see sashiko.

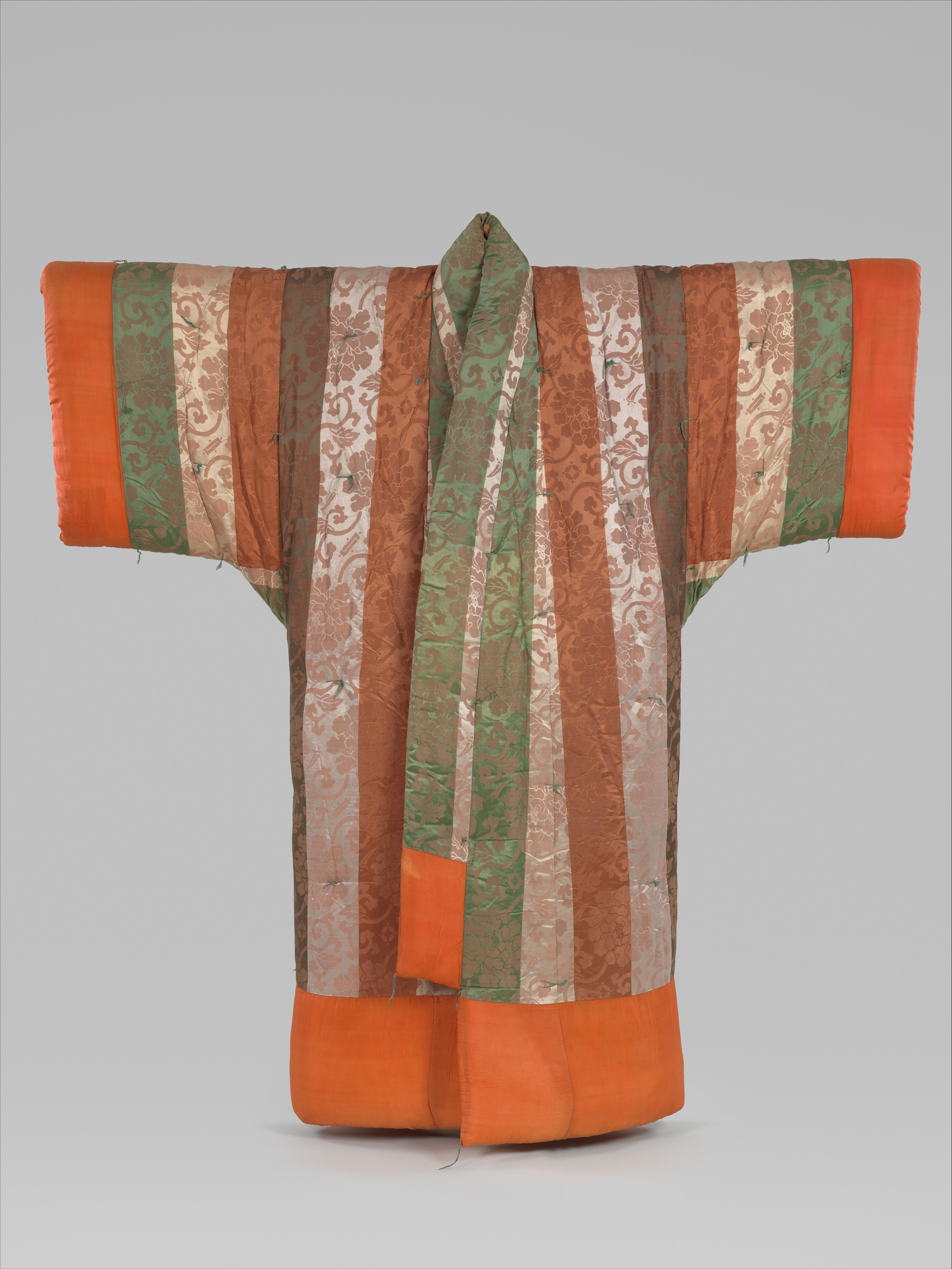
A warm winter yogi, front

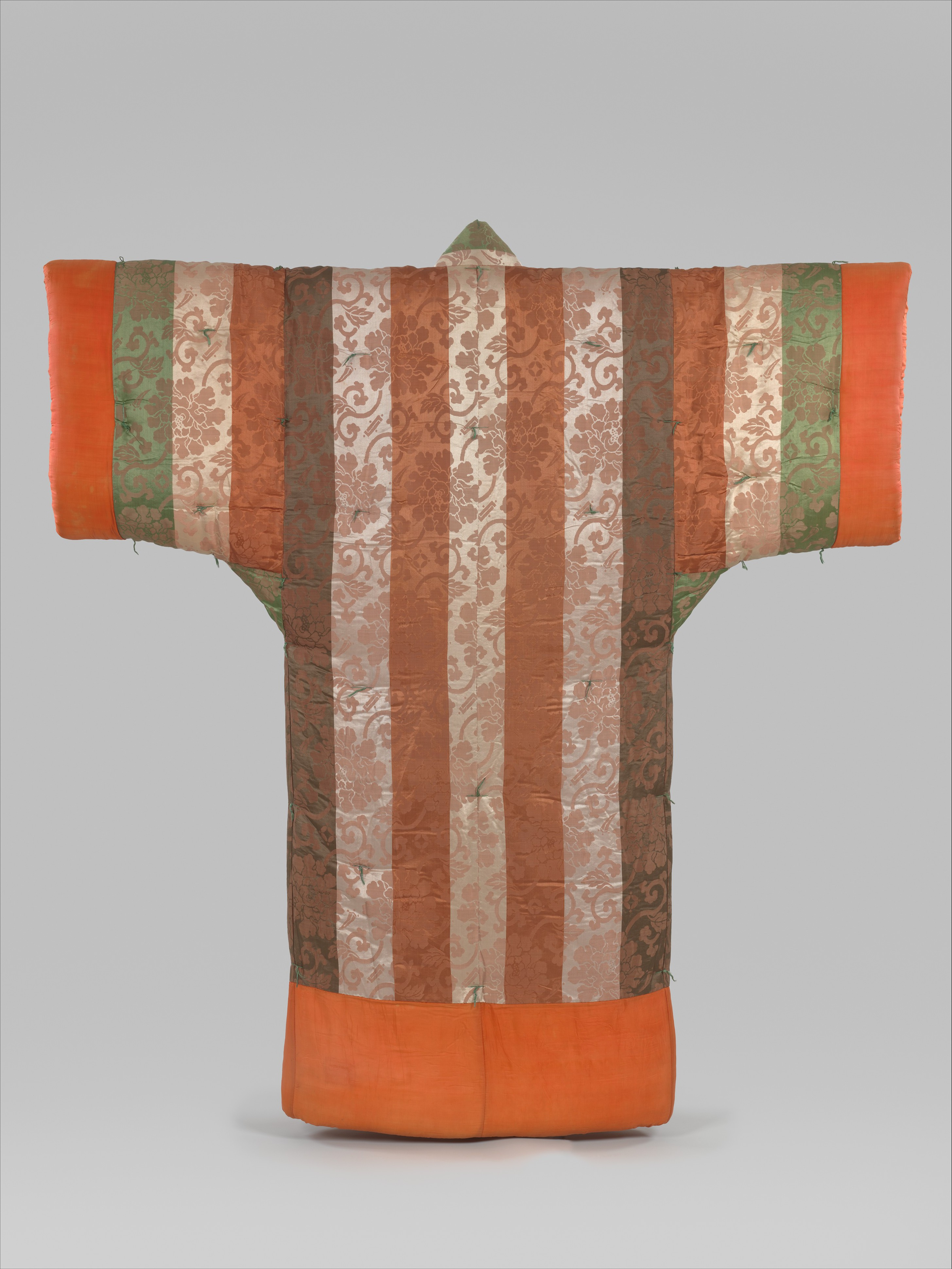
Back. Early 20th century.

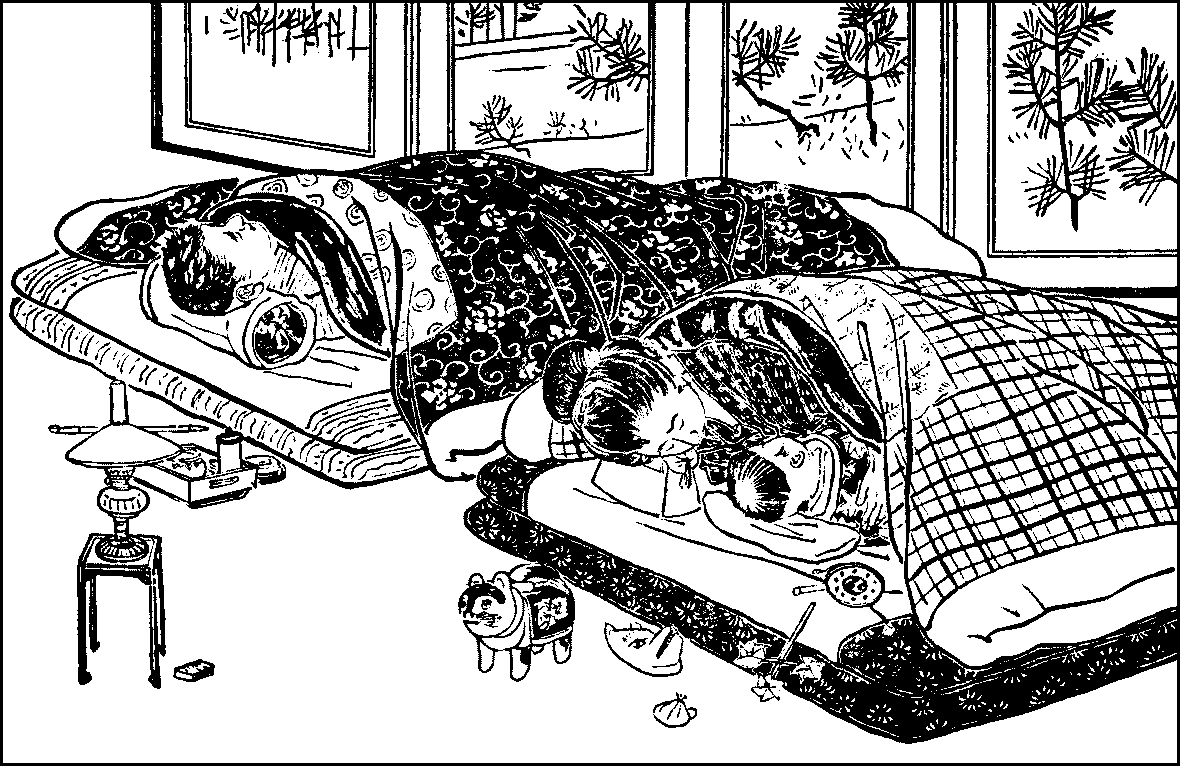
Typical Tokyo family sleeping arrangements of 1910

== Dimensions ==
Futons are traditionally laid on tatami rush mats, which are resilient and can absorb and re-release up to half a liter of moisture each. Tatamis measure 1 by 0.5 ken, just under 1 by 2 meters, the same size as a Western twin bed. A traditional shikibuton is also about the size of a Western twin bed. As of 2010, double-bed-sized shikibutons were available, but they can be a bit heavy and awkward to stow.

The shikibuton is usually 2–3 inches (5–8 cm) thick, and rarely as much as 6 inches (15 cm) thick; they need to dry well, or they will become heavy and mouldy. A shikibuton is thus about as thick as a Western mattress topper. If more thickness is needed, shikibutons are layered.

Kakebutons may be wider than shikibutons, and they vary in thickness. Depending on the weather, they may be layered with a warm mōfu (毛布), or replaced with a lighter taoruketto (タオルケット).

The traditional makura is usually smaller than a western pillow.

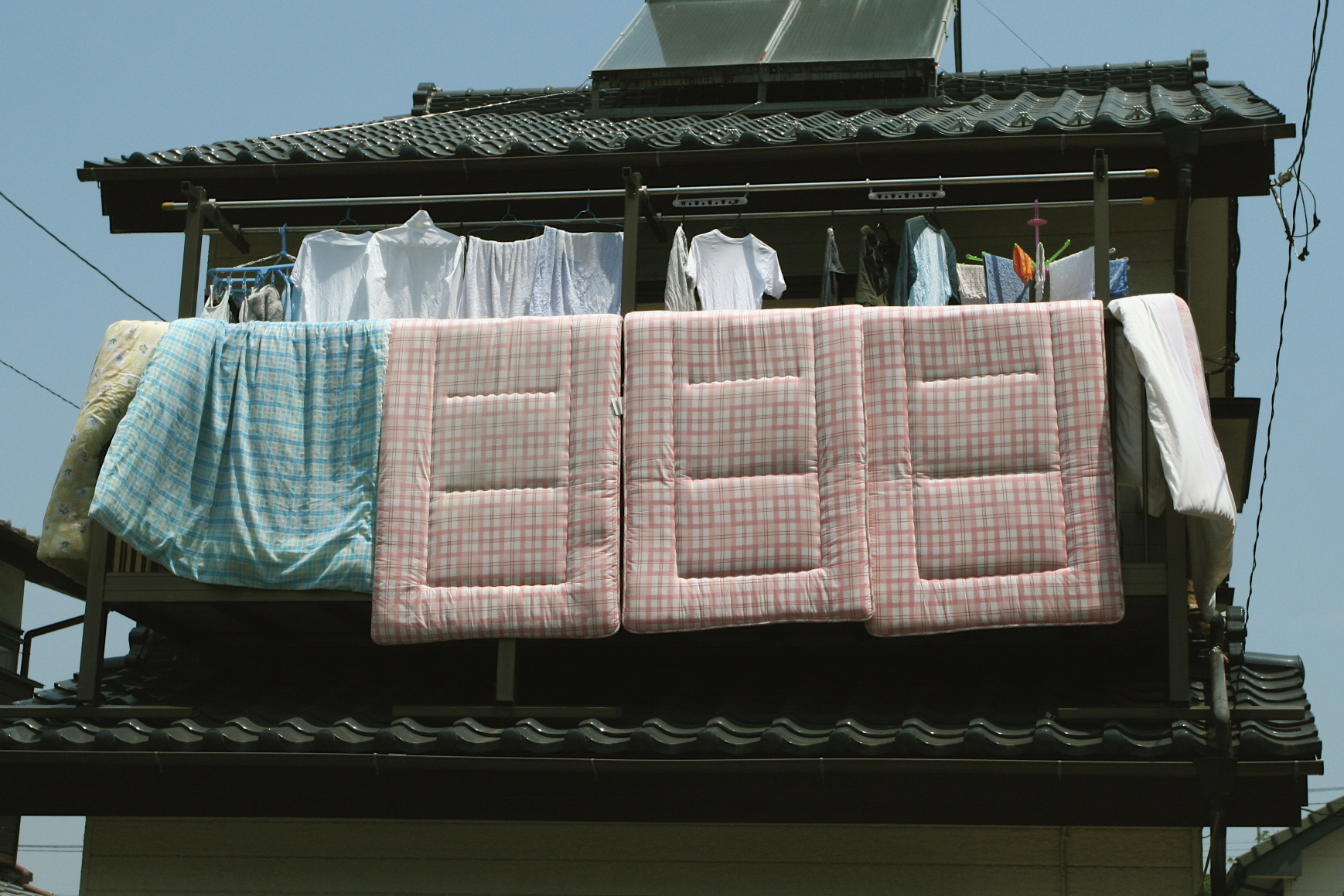
Futons hung out to air on a balcony

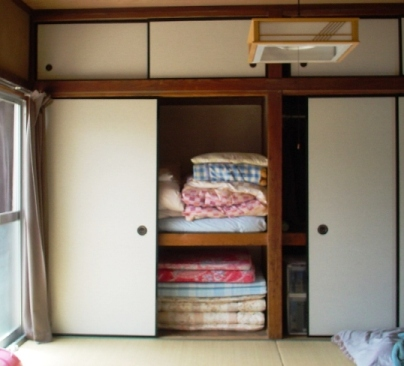
Futons stored in an oshiire, in a tatami-floored washitsu (traditional Japanese room)

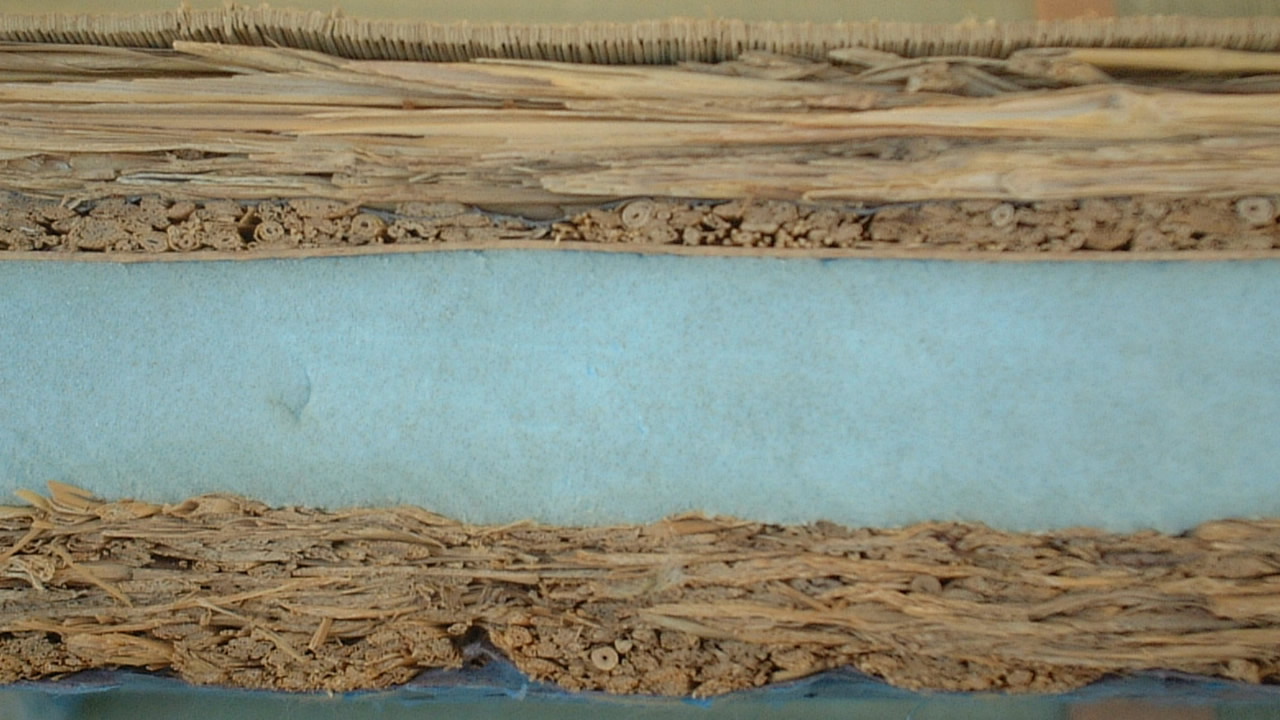
Cross-section of a tatami mat with a hidden extruded-polystyrene core and layers of the traditional igusa (common rush) top and bottom

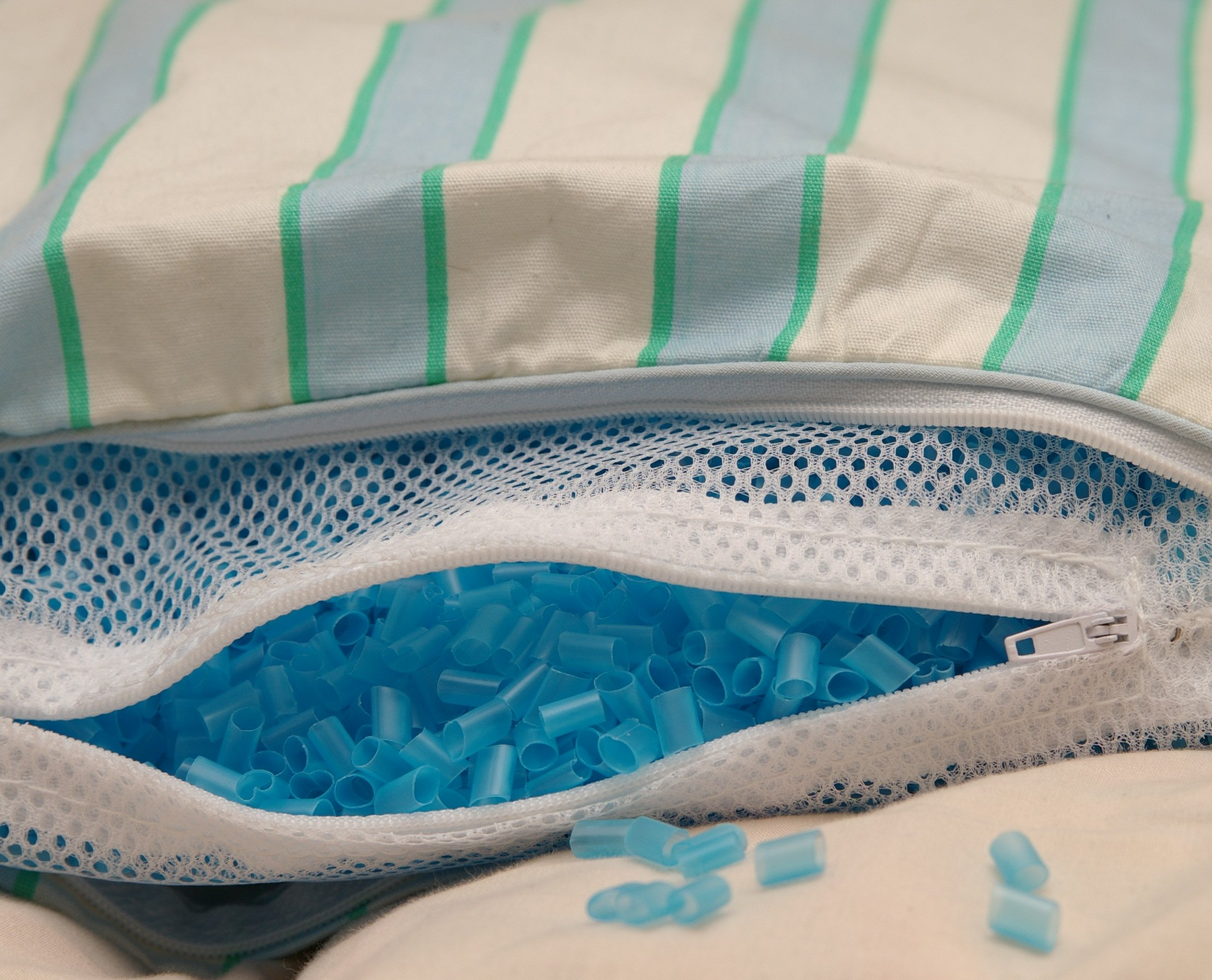
Pillow filled with tiny sections of plastic tubing

== Western-style futons ==
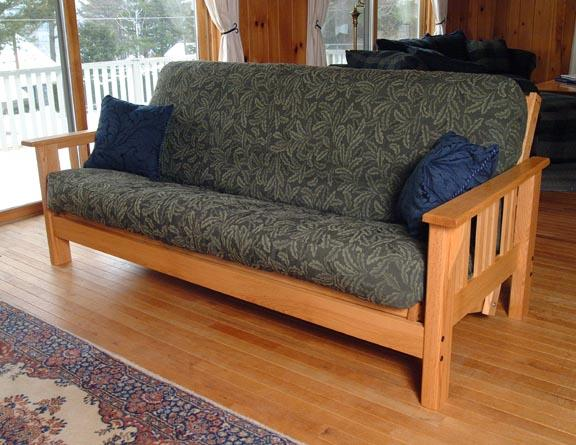
Western-style futon, folded into a sofa on a sofabed-futon frame

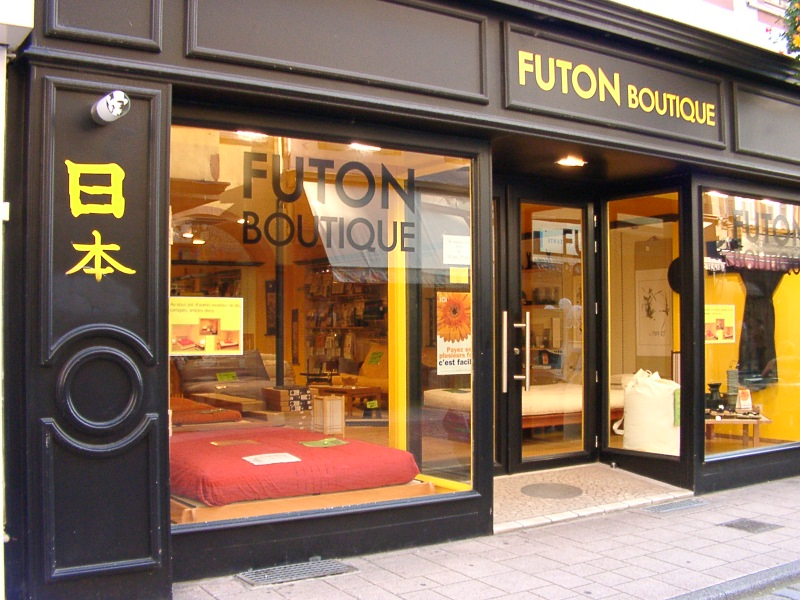
A shop in France selling westernized futons with frames

In the mid-1970s, futons became fashionable in North America. The construction method was similar to that of contemporary Japanese futons: cotton batting, covered in cotton ticking and held in place with hand-sewn tufting (through-thickness stitches). This was also the structure that had been used in the United States' 1940–1941 Cotton Mattress Program, designed to use excess cotton production by subsidizing materials for people to make their own cotton mattresses.

However, Western-style futons, which typically resemble low, wooden sofa beds, differ considerably from their Japanese counterparts. They often have the dimensions of standard western mattresses, and are too thick to fold double and stow easily in a cupboard. They are often set up and stored on a slatted frame, which avoids having to move them to air regularly, especially in the dry indoor air of a centrally-heated house (most Japanese homes were not traditionally centrally-heated).

== Futon-like traditional European beds ==
Traditional European beds resembled Japanese-style futon sets, with thin tick mattresses. These were only sometimes set on a bedframe. The term "bed" did not originally include the bedframe, but only the bedding, the same components included in a Japanese futon set.

It was also traditional to air these beds, and duvets are still aired in the window in Europe. In English-speaking cultures, however, airing bedding outdoors came to be seen as a foreign practice, with 19th-century housekeeping manuals giving methods of airing beds inside, and disparaging airing them in the window as "German-style".

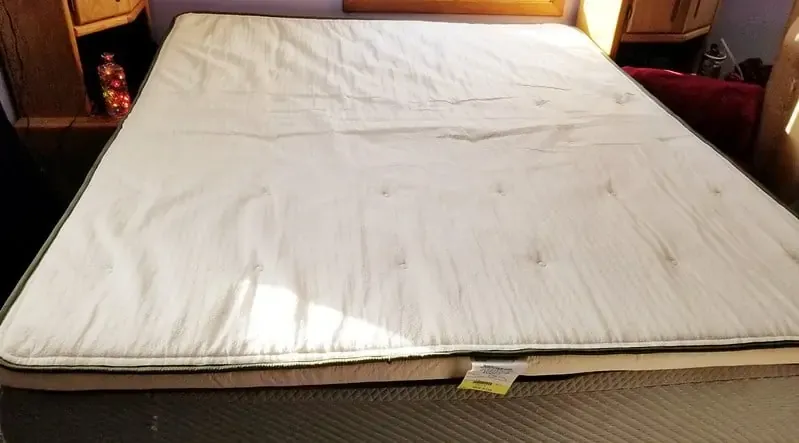
A mattress topper (white) on a boxspring mattress (grey). Mattress toppers are generally structurally similar to futons, are often made of similar materials, and (in the case of twin-bed toppers) have similar dimensions. Note the tufting.

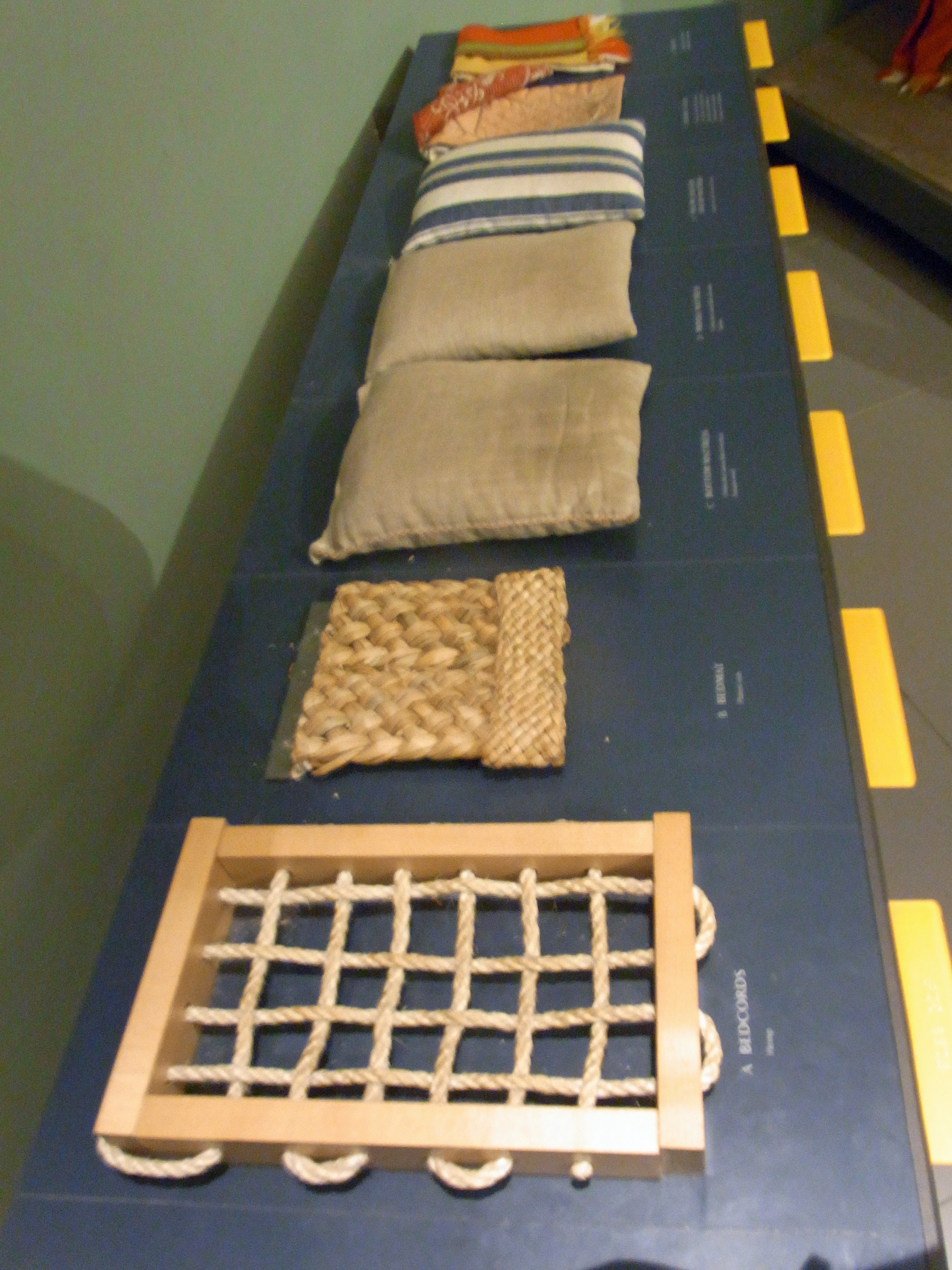
Museum samples demonstrating a 1590s bed: the bedcords, bedmat, three tick mattresses in dun and striped ticking, and the bedlinen

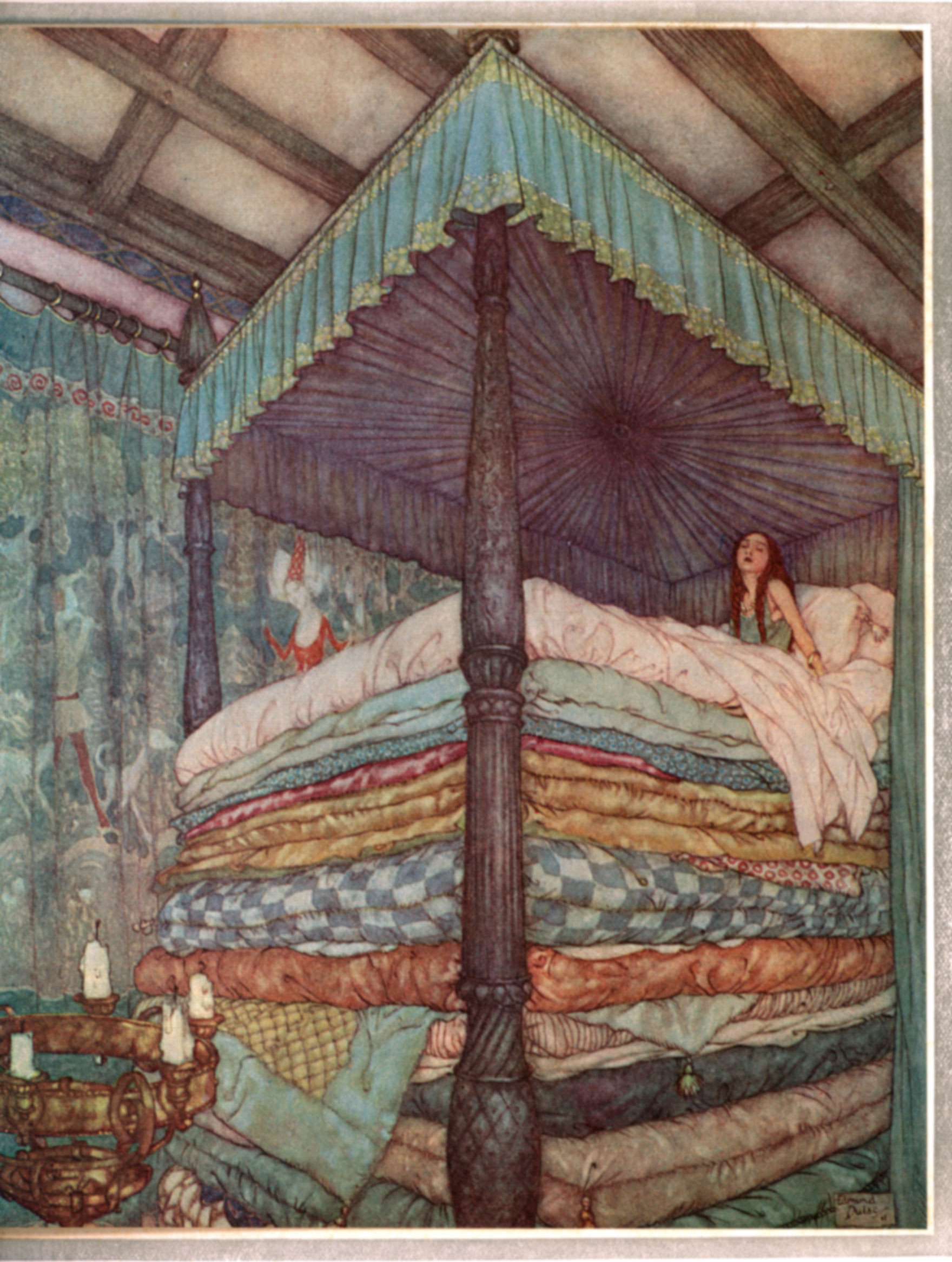
The fairytale "The Princess and the Pea" exaggerates the traditional European layering of thin mattresses.

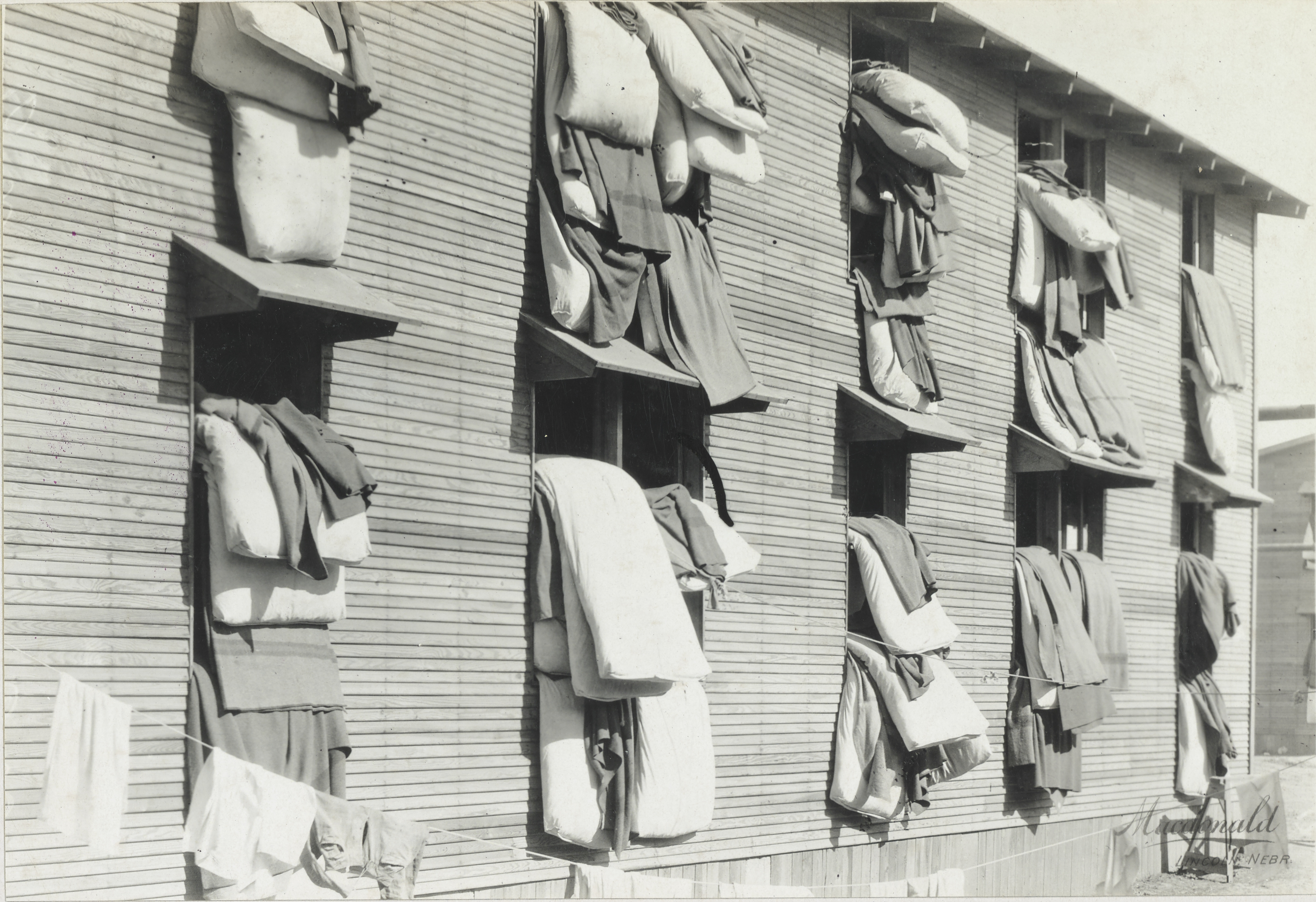
"Beds airing, Camp Funston, Kansas", in 1917 or 1918

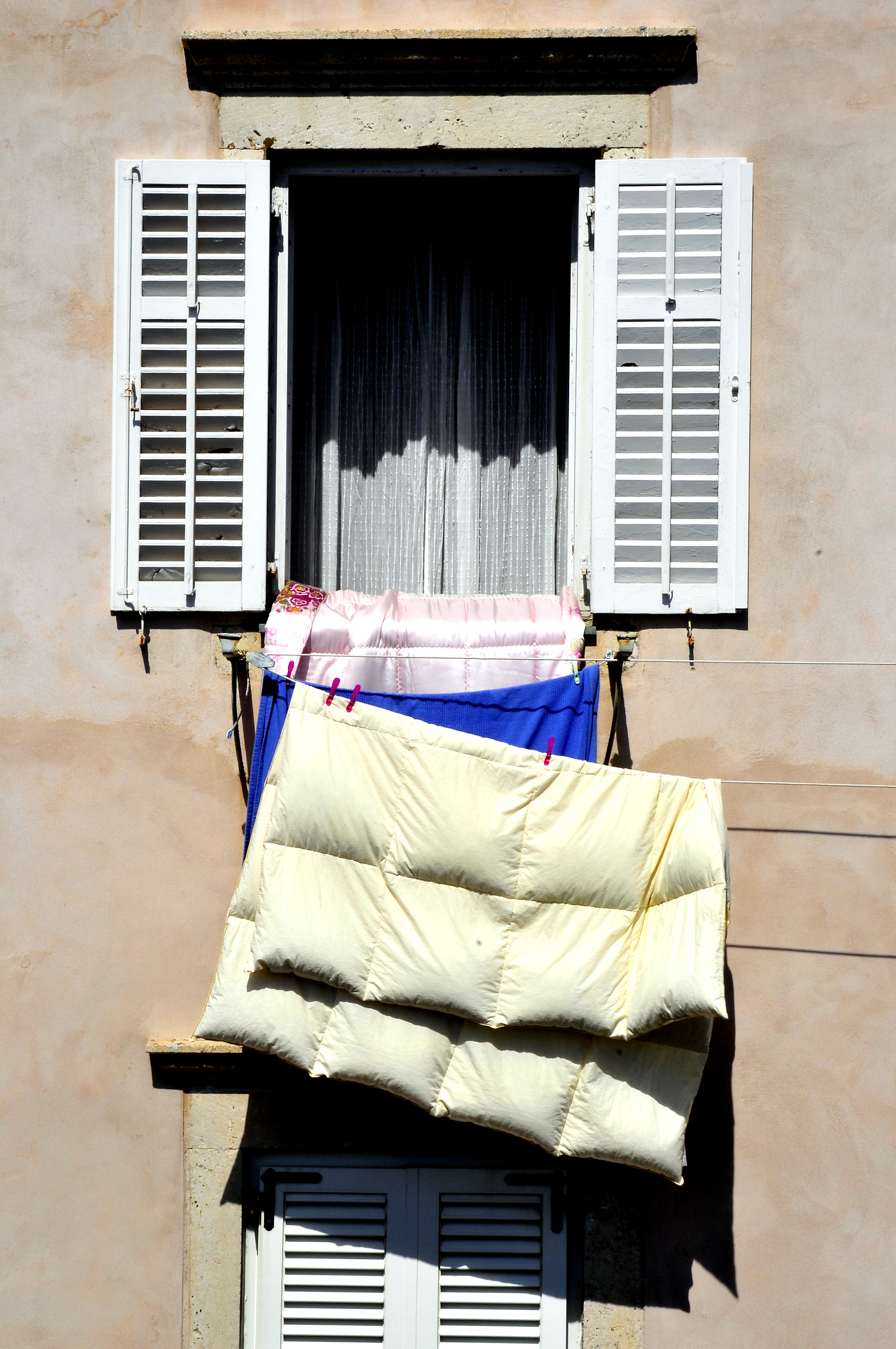
Airing a feather duvet in Dubrovnik, 2010

== See also ==
- Bed base
- Boroboroton – spirit-possessed boroboro futon
- Daybed – bed used for other purposes during the day
- Futon dryer – for airing futons when they can not be placed outside
- Housing in Japan
- Ken – unit on which houses are traditionally built
- Mattress topper —type of thin Western mattress, similar to a futon
- Murphy bed – bed that folds up into the wall
- Tick mattress – futon-like European bedding
- Washitsu (the type of rooms in which futons are frequently used)
- Zabuton – sitting futon, a smaller cushion
