= Boro (textile) =

Traditional Japanese textiles that have been mended or patched

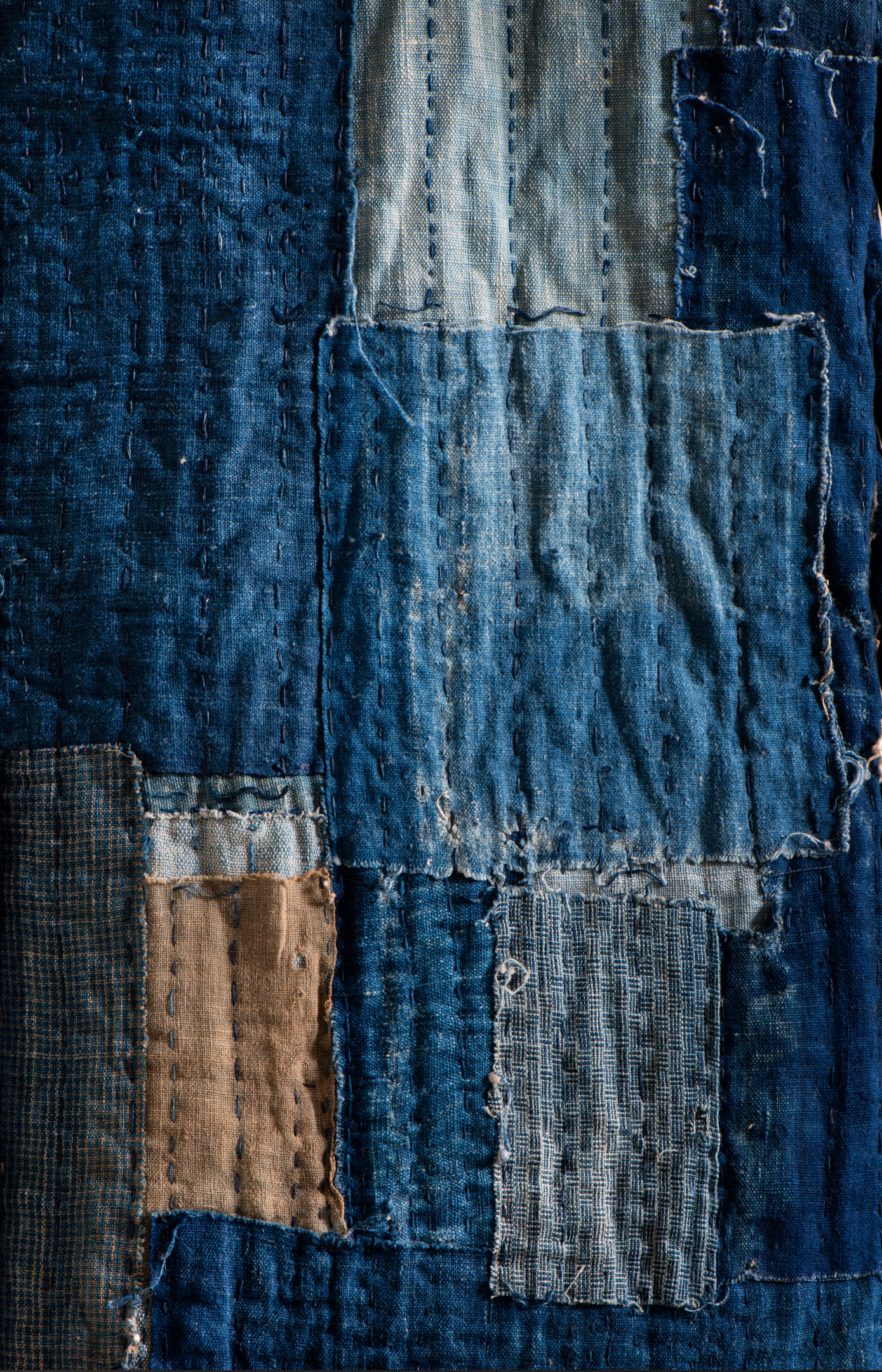
Boro textile with sashiko

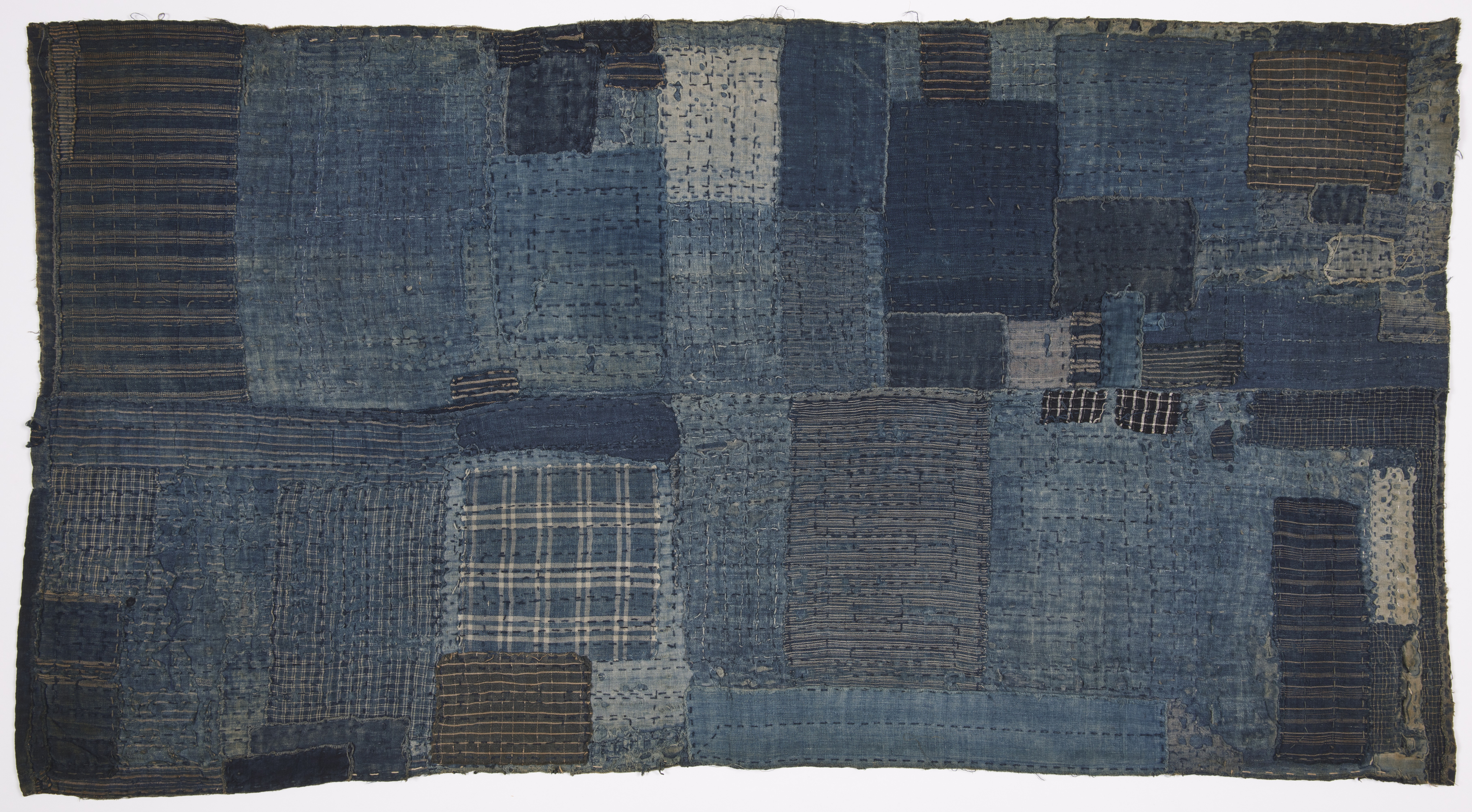
Child's sleeping mat (boro shikimono), late 19th century

Boro (ぼろ) are a class of Japanese textiles that have been mended or patched together.

== Etymology ==
The term is derived from the Japanese term "boroboro", meaning something tattered or repaired. The term 'boro' typically refers to cotton, linen and hemp materials, mostly hand-woven by peasant farmers, that have been stitched or re-woven together to create an often many-layered material used for warm, practical clothing.

Historically, it was more economical to grow, spin, dye, weave and make one's own clothing than buying new garments, and equally economical to re-use old, worn-out clothing as fabric for new garments. Warmer fibres, such as cotton, were also less commonly available, leading to the development of layering as a necessity in the creation of lower-class clothing.

Boro textiles are typically dyed with indigo dyestuff, historically having been the cheapest and easiest-to-grow dyestuff available to the lower classes. Many examples of boro feature kasuri dyework, and most extant examples of boro today are antiques or modern reproductions made as a craft project, with the introduction of cheaper ready-to-wear clothing to early 20th century Japan rendering the creation of boro mostly unnecessary.

== History ==
During the Edo period, fine silk and cotton fabrics were reserved for a select portion of the upper classes, either through official edicts of dress, or the simple factor of cost; silk fabrics were also unsuitable for working clothes, leading to most practical clothing being developed with the aim of practical wear. Many working-class people grew, spun, dyed and wove their own clothing, leading to the development of other fabrics, such as kasuri.

Due to the economic nature of repairing, re-using and re-weaving old clothing and fabrics, boro also developed out of a working-class need for inexpensive textiles, predominantly coming to signify the clothing of the peasant farming classes over time. Garments and textiles were repaired with spare fabric scraps out of necessity, and in many cases, the usage of repaired clothing lasted for several generations, leading to garments eventually resembling a complex and many-layered patchwork spanning decades of mending.

The usage of indigo dyestuff (ai) and indigo dyeing techniques (aizome) was common, with indigo dyes often being the only dyestuff available to the peasant classes. Indigo dye would often be grown and processed by the peasant classes themselves, being generally easy to grow, and also added a layer of protection to garments due to its moth-repelling properties.

Dyeing fabrics with indigo was also economical, as one indigo dyebath could be used to dye fabric a number of times, in contrast to the average dyebath having just one use.

A weak dyebath also provided benefits; a fabric dyed just a handful of times in a strong indigo dyebath would quickly fade, with the dye rubbing off from use in certain areas, whereas a fabric dyed repeatedly in a weak dyebath would be resistant to wear and more colourfast, also adding to the economical nature of indigo-dyed textiles.

== Preservation ==
Following the Meiji period and the general increase in living standards amongst the entire Japanese populace, most boro pieces were discarded and replaced by newer clothing. To many working class Japanese people, these garments were an embarrassing reminder of their former poverty, and little effort was expended by government or cultural institutions at the time to preserve such artifacts.

Over time, boro textiles came to exemplify the Japanese aesthetic of wabi-sabi, with the fabric's reflection of natural wear and use considered beautiful. Many extant examples were preserved through the efforts of folklorists such as Chuzaburo Tanaka, who personally collected over 20,000 pieces of boro during his lifetime, including 786 items now designated as Important Tangible Cultural Properties. 1,500 of these items were exhibited at the Amuse Museum in Asakusa, Tokyo.

== Saki-ori ==
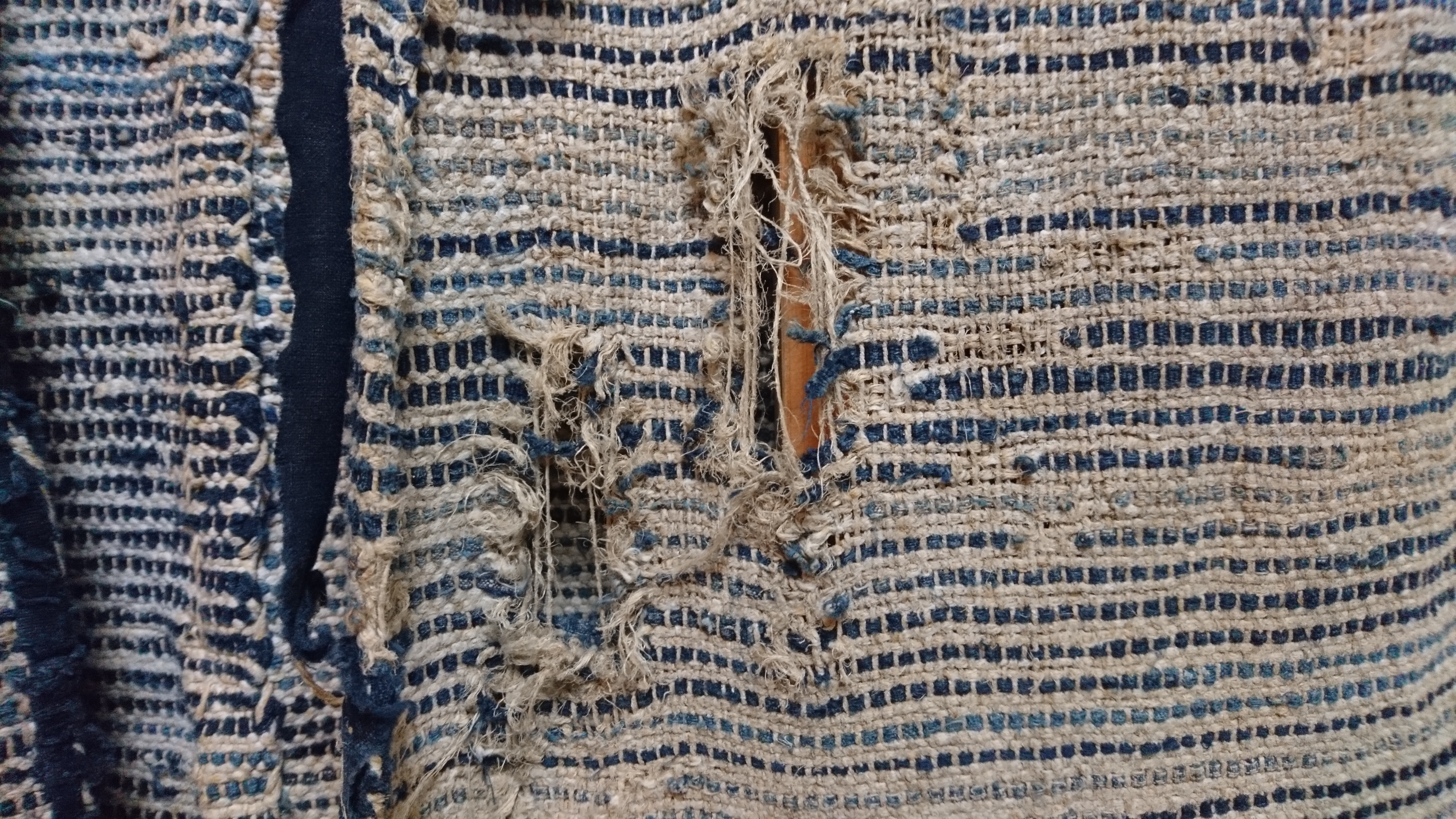
Saki-ori fabric is woven from indigo-dyed fabric strips.

Saki-ori was historically woven from old kimono cut into strips roughly 1 centimetre (0.39 in), with one obi requiring roughly three old kimono to make. Historically, garments, such as vests, might be made from saki-ori. Traditionally an article of thrift, sakiori obi are now quite expensive informal garments. Sakiori obi are one-sided, and also often feature ikat-dyed designs of stripes, checks and arrows, commonly using indigo dyestuff.

== See also ==
- Japanese clothing
- Noragi, Japanese farmer or peasant clothing
- Sashiko, a form of decorative reinforcement stitching (or functional embroidery) from Japan
- Mottainai, a Japanese term conveying a sense of regret concerning waste
- Shibui, a Japanese aesthetic of simple, subtle, and unobtrusive beauty
- Kintsugi, the Japanese art of repairing broken pottery with gold
- Iki, a Japanese aesthetic of casual but calculated style
- Tanmono, narrow-loom traditional cloth
- Boroboroton, a spirit-possessed boroboro futon
