= Futon dryer =

Electric device for drying futons

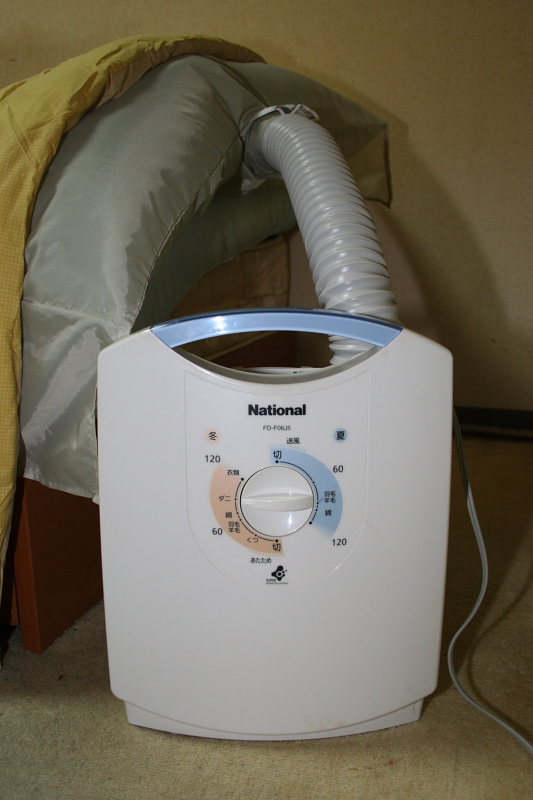
Futon dryer in use

A Futon dryer (布団乾燥機, futonkansōki) is an electric device that warms and dries a Japanese futon by forcing warm air through it.

== Mechanism ==
A futon dryer works by drawing in air with an electric fan and heating it, and then forcing it into a large cloth pouch. The pouch is usually inserted between the futon mattress and comforter, and hot air is forced through it for about an hour to dry the futon.

Futon dryers run on a timer, and when the timer reaches zero, cold air is blown before the unit shuts off. A futon drier uses about 600 watts of electricity, about the same as a hair dryer.

== Purpose ==
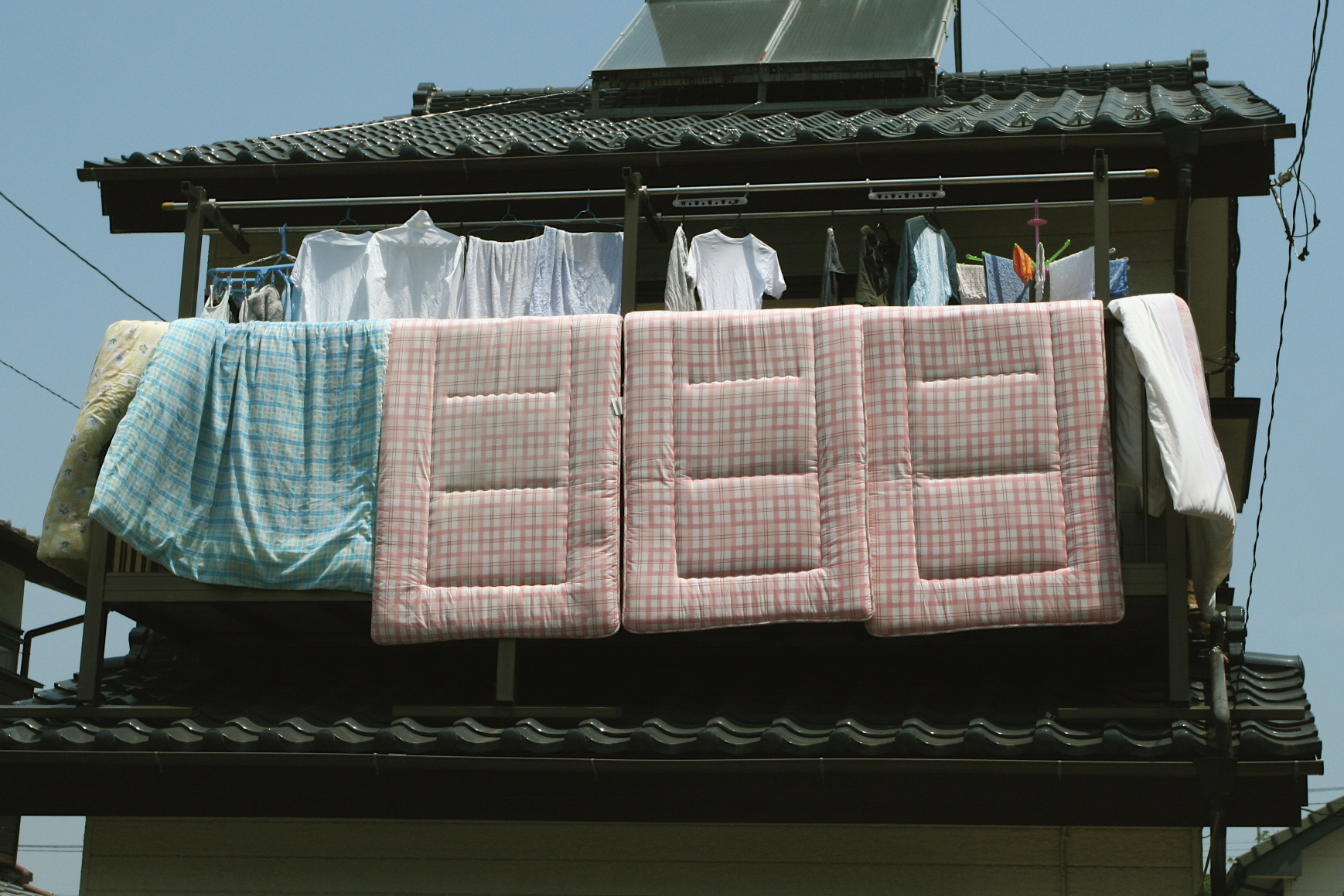
Futon hung out to dry

A futon must be kept dry because human sweat and body heat create a warm, moist environment which is amenable to mites. Traditionally, futon are kept dry by hanging them out on a balcony in the sun to dry in the open air, but some people are too busy to do this since they must be hung during daylight hours and brought in before sunset, when the temperature drops and moisture condenses inside the futon. Finding time to hang a futon may also be difficult during the rainy season in Japan, since there are few sunny days and there are frequent and sudden periods of rain so a futon dryer can fulfill the function of keeping the futon dry and keeping the level of mites living in the futon down without needing to hang it out.

Many dryers also have attachments for drying shoes or boots, or air pouches which can be folded to dry clothes in place of a clothes dryer. The dryer can be run for under an hour to warm the futon without completely drying it, or over an hour to reduce the population of mites.
