= Cotton duck =

Plain woven cotton fabric

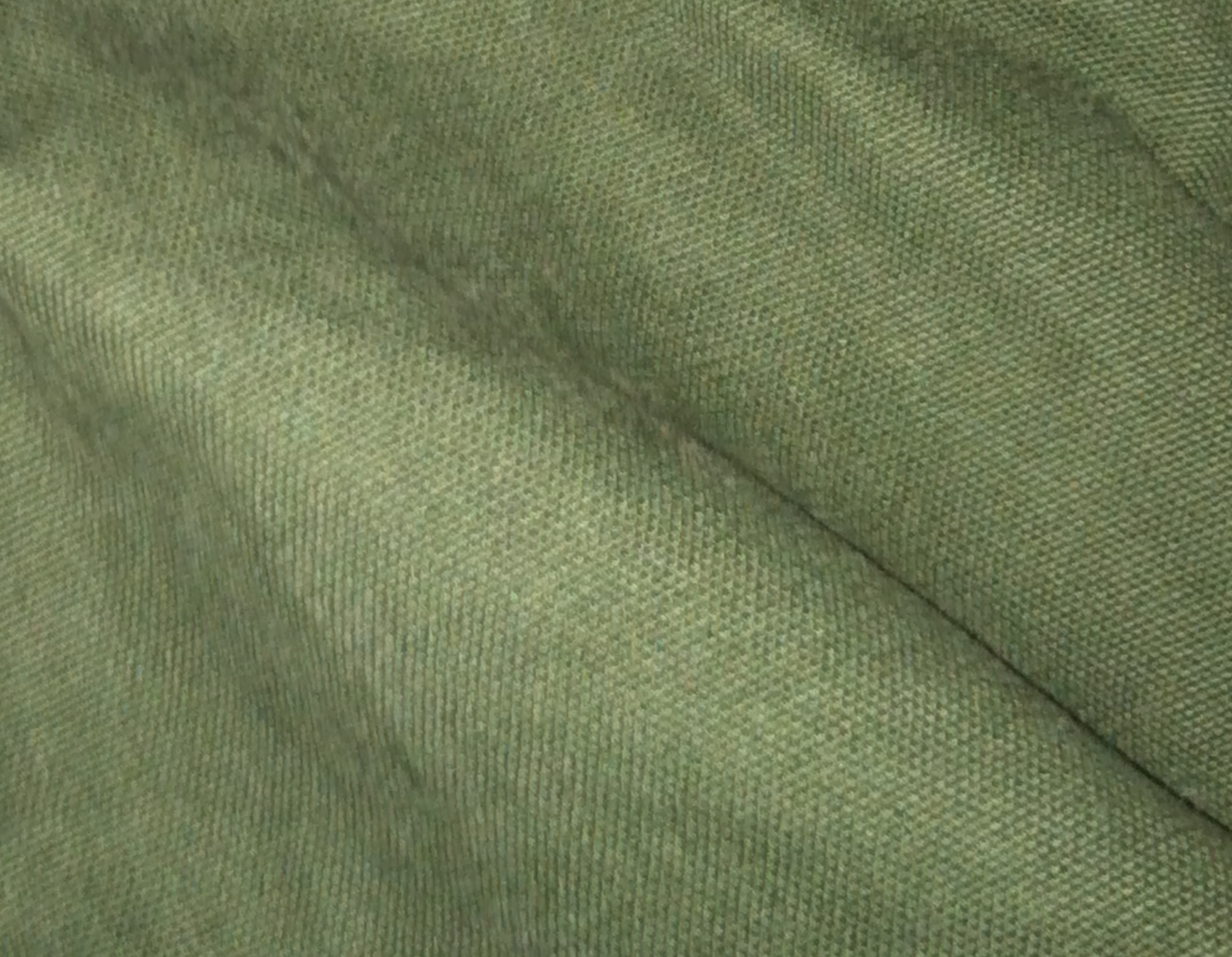
Cotton duck used in a pair of heavy-duty work pants

Cotton duck (from Dutch: doek, meaning "cloth"), also simply duck, sometimes duck cloth or duck canvas, is a heavy, plain woven cotton fabric. Duck canvas is more tightly woven than plain canvas. There is also linen duck, which is less often used.

Cotton duck is used in a wide range of applications, from sneakers to painting canvases to tents to sandbags.

Historically, white untwilled cotton or linen fabric uniforms of this name were worn by British and French soldiers serving in the tropics.

Duck fabric is woven with two yarns together in the warp and a single yarn in the weft.

By treating with wax, duck fabric can be made waterproof (see waxed cotton).

Cotton duck strips were the origin of duck tape, recorded in the Oxford English Dictionary as having been in use since 1899 (see duct tape).

== Classification ==
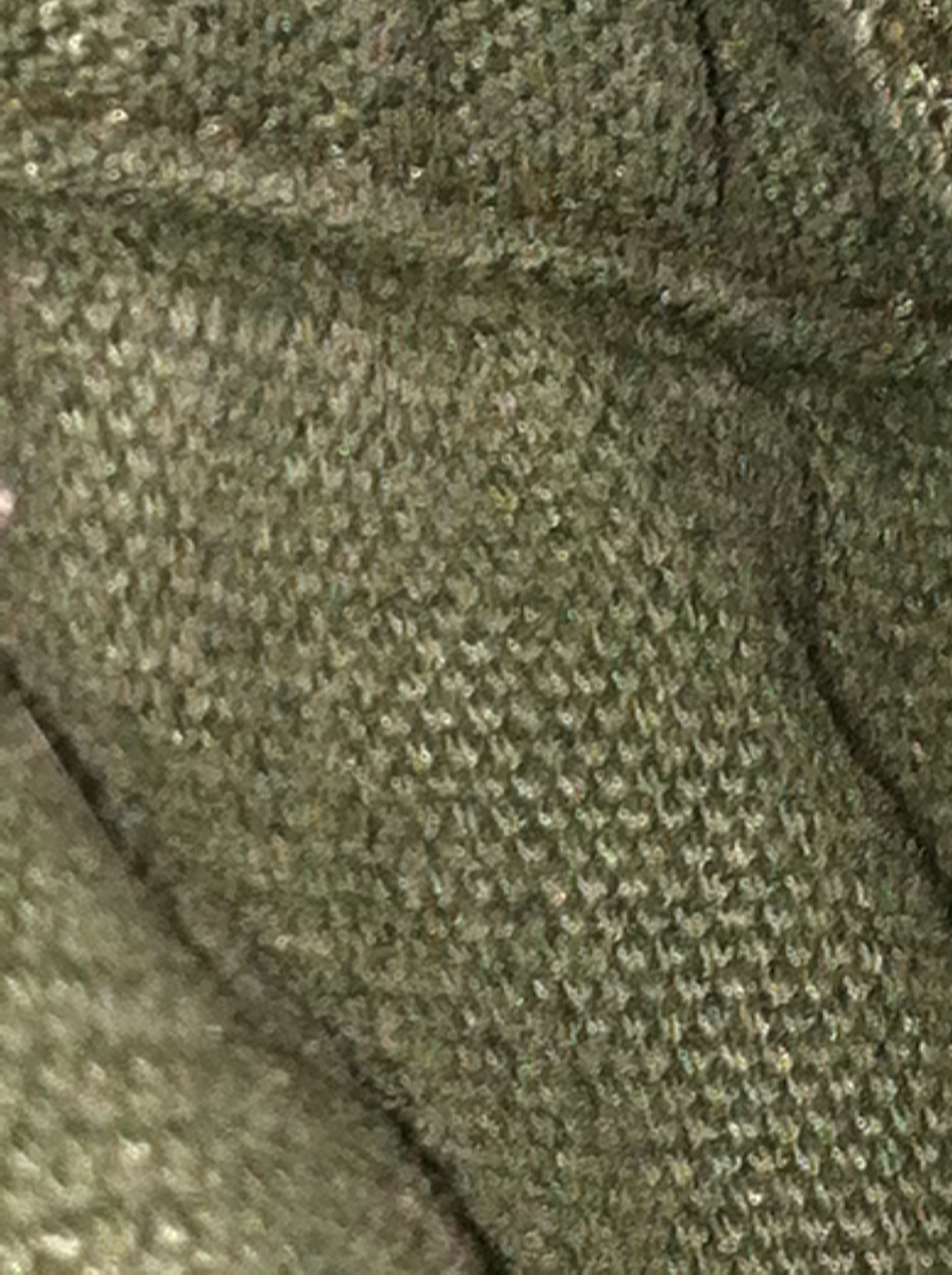
Close-up showing weave

Duck is classified according to weight in a numerical system, with grade 1 the heaviest and grade 12 the lightest variety. Besides this, traditional names exist, which are rarely used today.

The classification system used today dates from the 1920s. A numbered duck classification system was put into effect by the Cotton Duck Association and the United States Department of Commerce when discrepancies came about with various specifications and qualities of material. In a technical paper titled "Development of the Standard Numbered Cotton Duck Specification", the Department's National Bureau of Standards established a set of specifications acceptable to manufacturer and consumer.

According to the Department of Commerce, "The number of the duck is based on the following computation: Number of Duck = 19 − (Weight per linear yard 22 inches wide in ounces)." This numbering system is used to describe the various weights of duck cloth, based on the weight of a 36-by-22-inch (91 cm × 56 cm) piece. Weights below 19 ounces are called numbered duck. Those above 19 ounces are called naught duck. The grade of numbered duck refers to the number of ounces subtracted from 19 for a 36-by-22-inch piece of fabric. For example, a piece of No. 8 numbered duck with dimensions of 36 by 22 inches weighs 11 ounces (310 g) (19 − 8 = 11).

Number duck classifications per linear yard, 22 inches wide

Numbered duck is nominally made in weights from 1 to 12, but numbers 7, 9, and 11 are no longer used. Some typical uses of various grades (with weights in ounces) are:

- No. 1 (18 oz): hammocks, cots, sandbags
- No. 2 (17 oz): hatch paulins
- No. 3 (16 oz): heavy-duty bags
- No. 4 (15 oz): sea bags
- No. 5 (14 oz): heavy work clothes
- No. 6 (13 oz): large boat covers, heavy work clothes
- No. 8 (11 oz): work clothes, clothes bags
- No. 10 (9 oz): work clothes, shower curtains
- No. 12 (7 oz): light clothes

Number duck classifications per square yard

There is often confusion when it comes to matching up weights and the correct number duck classification. The table below accurately represents the weight and number duck classification per square yard instead of linear yard 22 inches wide.

- No. 1 (30 oz/yd^{2} or 1,000 g/m^{2}): floor & wall covering, sound absorption, equipment covers, heavy bags, horse packs, storage bins
- No. 2 (28 oz/yd^{2} or 950 g/m^{2}): hatch paulins
- No. 3 (26 oz/yd^{2} or 880 g/m^{2}): sea bags
- No. 4 (24 oz/yd^{2} or 810 g/m^{2}): heavy-duty work clothes, hammocks, sand bags, director chairs, place mats, belting
- No. 5 (23 oz/yd^{2} or 780 g/m^{2}): heavy work clothes
- No. 6 (21 oz/yd^{2} or 710 g/m^{2}): utility bags, place mats, belting
- No. 8 (18 oz/yd^{2} or 610 g/m^{2}): backpacks, painted floor cloths, tents, tarps, awnings, work clothes, clothes bags
- No. 10 (14.75 oz/yd^{2} or 500 g/m^{2}): artist canvas, murals, shower curtains, painted floor cloths, hammocks, clothes
- No. 12 (11.5 oz/yd^{2} or 390 g/m^{2}): stretched artist canvas, furniture slip covers, light clothes

== See also ==
- Denim
- Drill (fabric)
- Duct tape
- Dungaree
- Ticking
- Twill
