= Rayadillo =

Woven fabric material

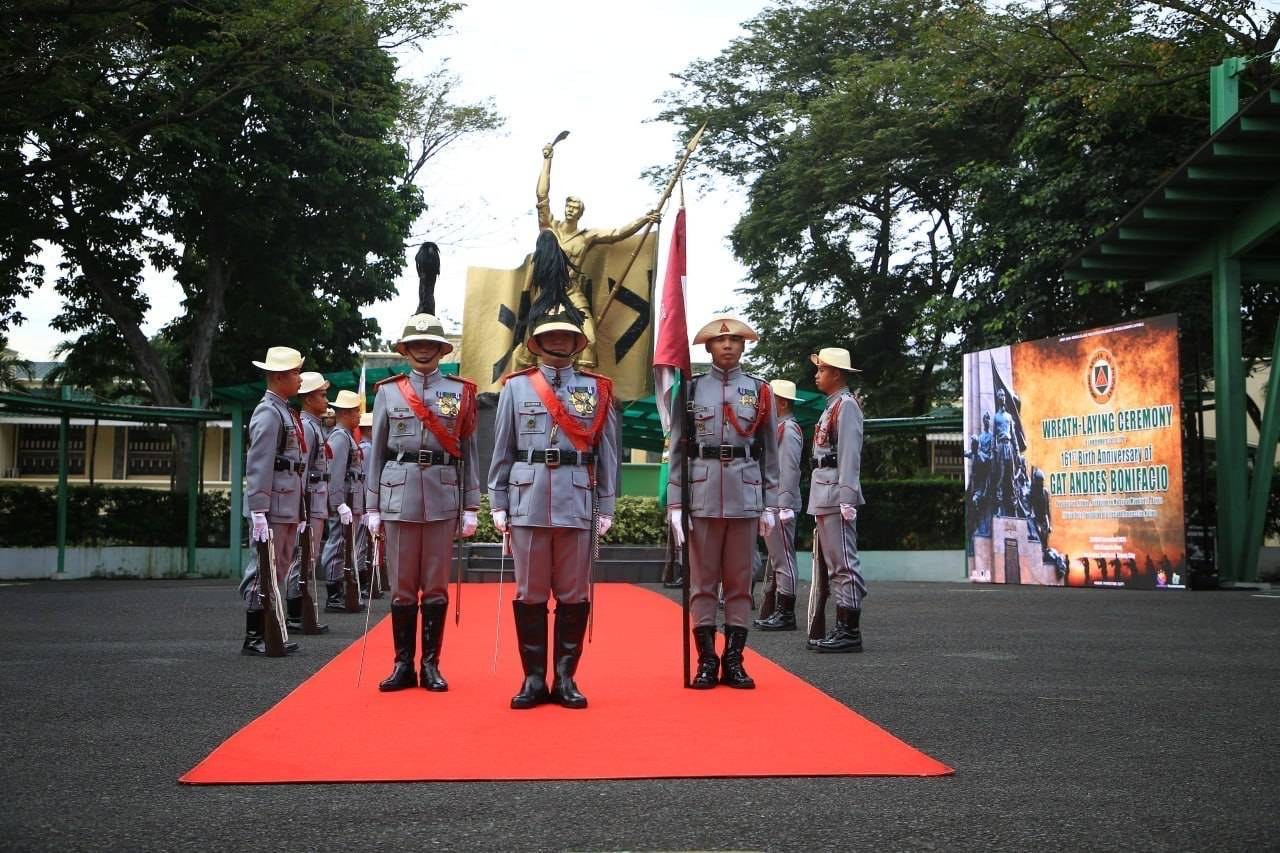
Philippine Army Security and Escort Battalion honor guards in gala rayadillo during the 2024 Bonifacio Day commemoration

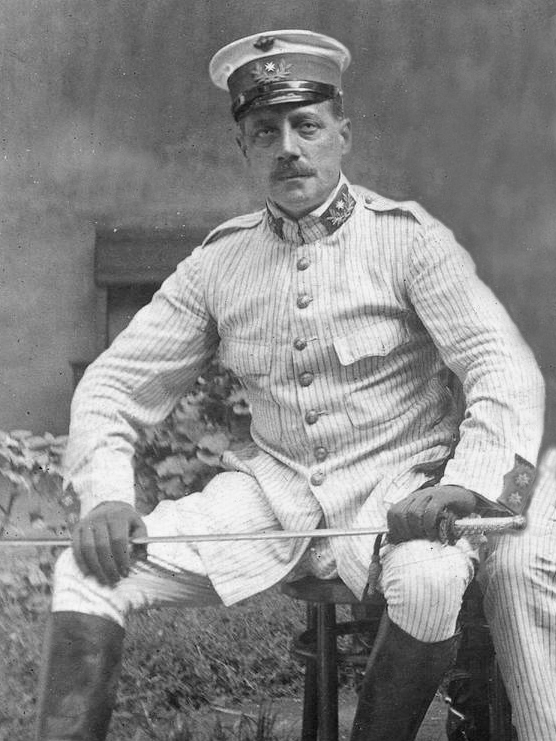
Spanish officer wearing the summer rayadillo uniform during the 1909 Second Melillan campaign

Rayadillo (transl. striped material) is a blue-and-white striped cotton or flannel material that was used to make the military uniforms worn by Spanish colonial soldiers from the later 19th century until the early 20th century. It was commonly worn by soldiers posted in overseas Spanish tropical colonies, Spanish Morocco and Spanish Guinea, before being adopted as a summer uniform by units stationed in Spain itself and as a gala uniform in the Philippines.

== Use ==
Introduced in 1850 as uniforme de campania for Spanish infantry garrisoning the enclave of Melilla on the coast of Morocco, rayadillo was both more serviceable and less conspicuous for hot weather wear than the blue serge coats and red trousers worn in Spain itself. It became popular after being worn during the Spanish–American War, and was later adopted by the Philippine Army. It also served as the summer uniform of the regular army in Spain until replaced by khaki drill in 1914.

== Appearance ==
The term rayadillo is Spanish, which translates to "striped material". In the mid-19th century, this material was referred to as being of hilo listado azul, or "blue striped thread". It was known as dril azul rayado or "blue striped drill" by the end of the century. Early examples of the fabric seemed to have had light blue stripes which were widely separated, while surviving examples of uniform jackets and trousers from the 1890s have thinner stripes of a darker blue, known during that period as mil rayas – literally, "a thousand stripes". Seen from a distance, rayadillo looked either very light blue or blue-gray. The garments were known to some British commentators as "pyjamas", due to a fancied resemblance to striped sleeping garments.

== Philippines ==
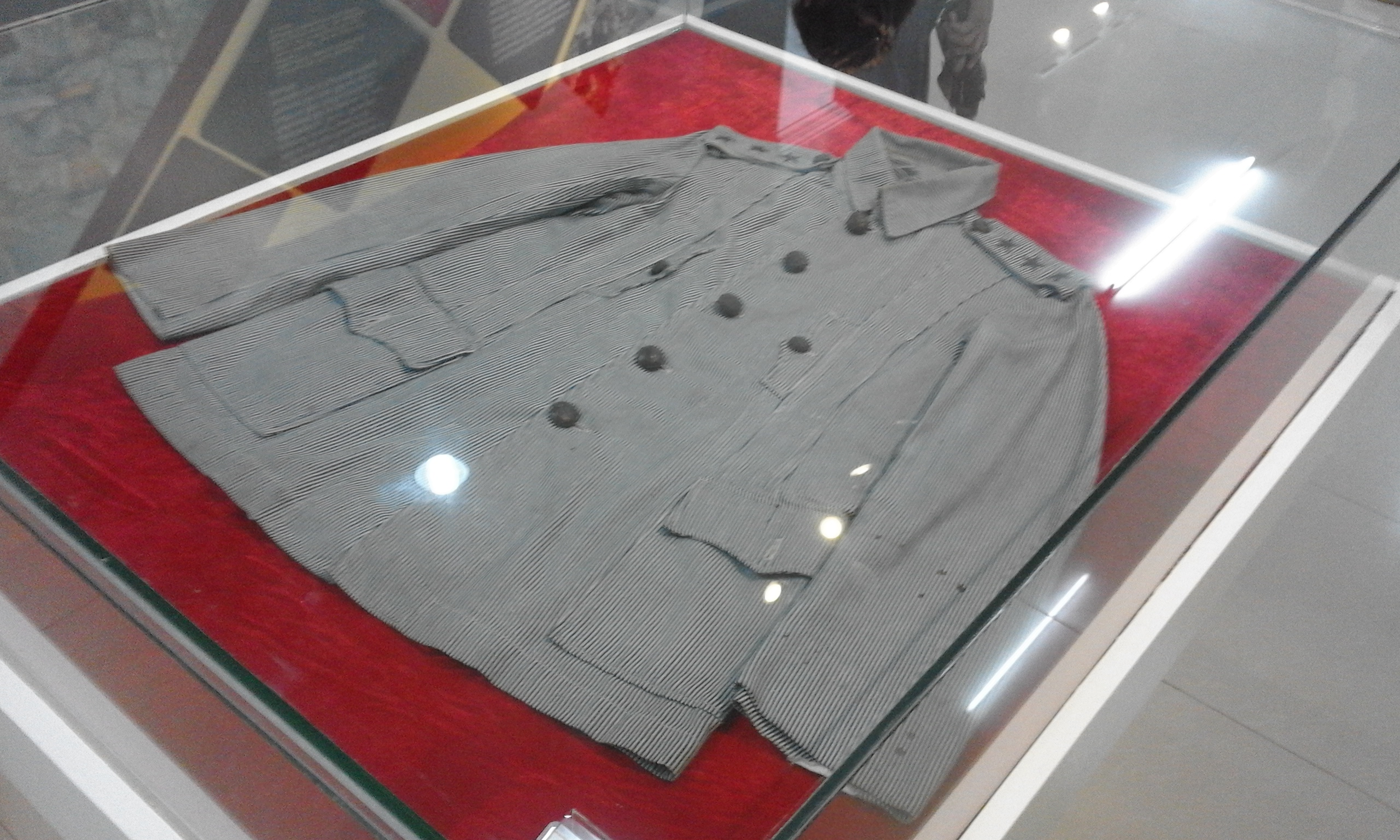
A Mambisa "Norfolk" rayadillo of the Philippine Army

The Republican Army of the First Philippine Republic under Emilio Aguinaldo also employed the same fabric in their military uniforms during the later years of the Philippine Revolution and the Philippine–American War.

Along with pith helmets, which were also first worn by the Spanish in Southeast Asia, the rayadillo uniform became strongly associated with Imperialism and was a symbol of colonial rule. In the Philippines, the Rayadillo uniform is synonymous with the First Republic and the Philippine American War (1899-1902).

In more recent times, rayadillo patterns have made a reappearance in the world of clothing and tailoring in general, and have been popularised in everyday garments, specially in trousers, also known as mil rayas.

== Rayadillo military uniforms ==
Military uniforms made out of the rayadillo material were of a number of patterns:

=== Spanish Empire ===
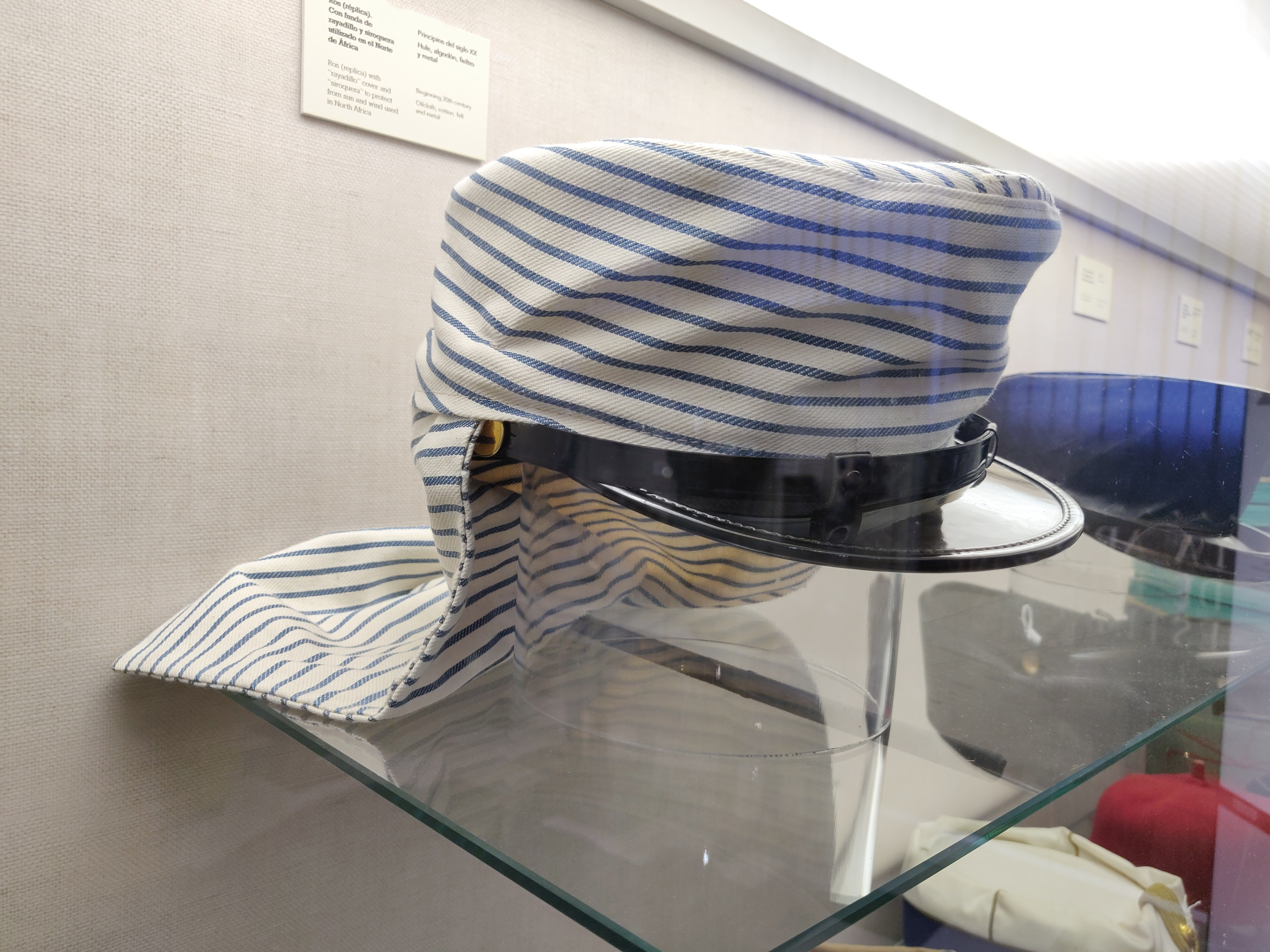
A 'siroquera' in rayadillo pattern used by the Spanish forces in Morocco c. 1910

==== Guerrera ====
The guerrera, or campaign jacket worn with the rayadillo uniform was made of deep blue flannel and had two breast pockets with flaps. It was fastened by a single row of seven metal buttons. The jacket was patterned on the tunic officially prescribed for general wear by the infantry of the Spanish Peninsular Army on August 18, 1886. The guerrera was worn by Spanish troops stationed in the Philippines, Cuba and Puerto Rico. The Philippine-issue rayadillo patterned guerrera was distinguishable from those issued in Cuba and Puerto Rico by a standing collar and concealed button fly front. A single hook and eye is found at the bottom of the collar opening. This uniform was issued in 1891 until 1898.

==== Guayabera ====
The guayabera was patterned on a traditional Cuban work jacket. The tunic features pleats down the front and center back and four large cargo pockets on the skirt. It may or may not have a concealed button fly front. Bone is the preferred material for buttons; those on the shoulder strap and pockets are sometimes covered in rayadillo fabric. A thin white cotton lining is found in the interior shoulder area. Evidence culled from period photographs indicate these uniforms being issued about 1896 until 1898.

=== Philippine Republic ===
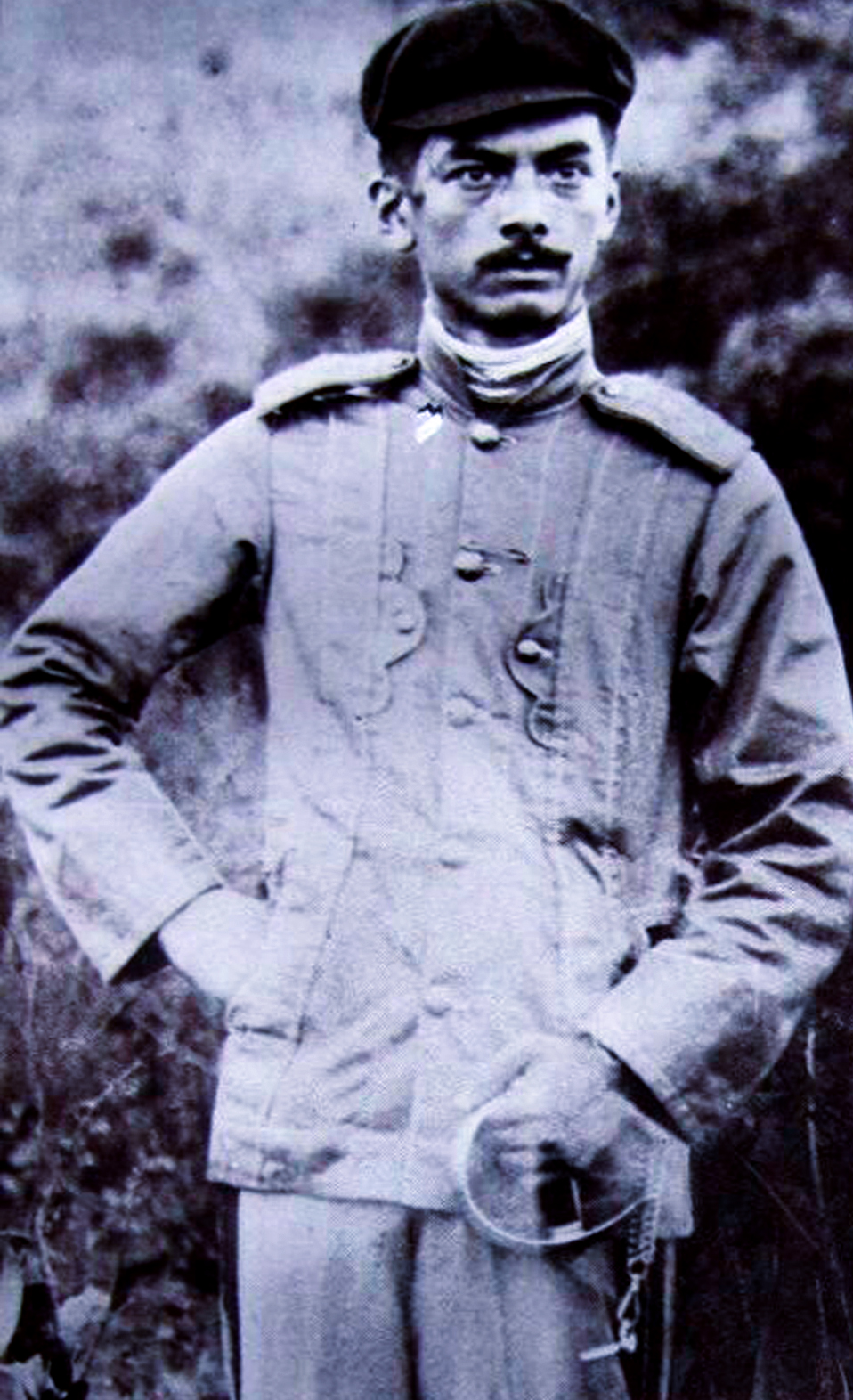
Manuel L. Quezon, 2nd President of the Philippines wearing his Mambisa Rayadillo as a Major in the Philippine Republican Army

The Filipino mambisa military tunic was instituted by what would eventually become the Philippine Republic during the Tejeros Convention. It had two broad bands of matching fabric spanning the frontal area from the shoulders down to the hem. These concealed horizontal breast pockets which had vertical pocket flaps with buttons of either brass or covered with rayadillo fabric. The brass buttons were either unadorned or decorated with a "mythological sun" motif. Officers' tunics had slits in the skirt's side that allowed a hand gun holster and a sword to be attached to a belt worn under the tunic. Infantry officers wore blue pants with two white stripes down the sides, while Cavalry officers wore red trousers with black stripes.

The artist Juan Luna is credited with this design. His brother, general Antonio Luna commissioned him with the task. Juan Luna also designed the collar insignia for the uniforms, distinguishing between the services; Infantry, Cavalry, Artillery, Sappers and medical personnel. At least one researcher has postulated that Juan Luna may have patterned the tunic after the English Norfolk jacket, since the Filipino version is not a copy of any Spanish-pattern uniform. That Emilio Aguinaldo and his comrades, during their exile in Hong Kong, had uniforms made of rayadillo in this popular sporting pattern is another probable origin.

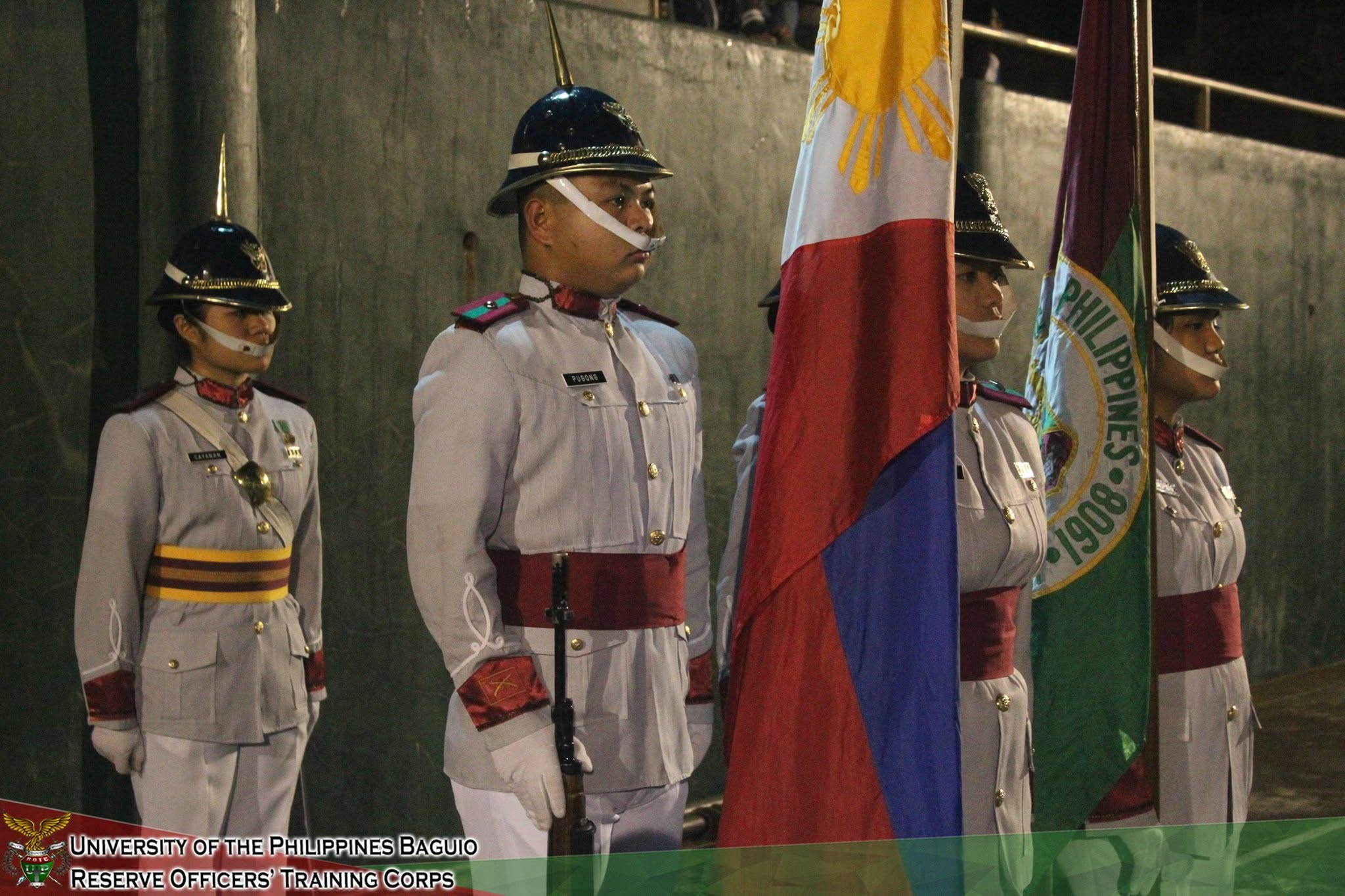
UP Baguio ROTC wearing rayadillo uniforms and spiked helmets during a university event, 2017.

=== Later use ===
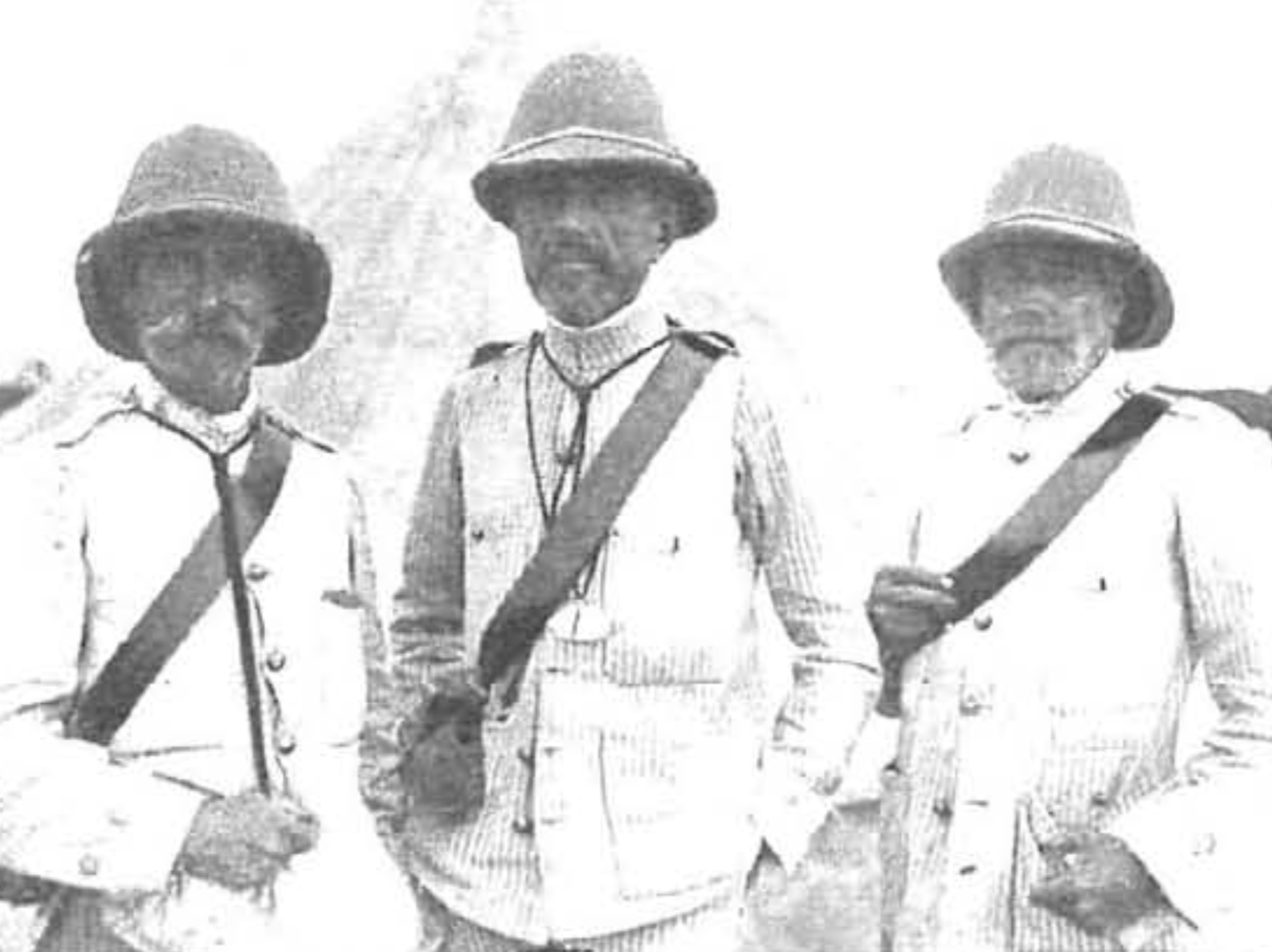
Soldiers wearing rayadillo uniforms and pith helmets in Spanish North Africa, 1909

The rayadillo clothing continued to be worn extensively by the Spanish Army into the early 20th century. It was worn on active service in Morocco by most Spanish units until 1911-1914, when khaki drill was adopted. By now an essentially white uniform with fine blue stripes, it also comprised the home service summer dress (de verano) for all branches of the Peninsular (mainland Spain) Army until 1914.

In the Philippines, Mambisa-style 'rayadillo' uniforms were worn mostly by Veterans of the Philippine Revolution and of the Philippine–American War during the American period till the early years of the Republic as part of their heritage. Meanwhile, rayadillo-inspired uniforms are used by the Armed Forces of the Philippines as part of their ceremonial uniforms during national occasions, most notably Philippine Independence day. In particular the Philippine Army's Escort and Security Battalion uses it as the primary full dress uniform (in tandem with the modern full dress), with other ranks wearing straw hats and officers the pith helmet. In 2005, Gen. Cardozo M. Luna, Commandant of the Philippine Military Academy ordered the revival of the rayadillo material in the cadets' dress uniform, discarding the United States Military Academy-inspired dress uniform long used in the PMA. Rayadillo-styled uniforms are worn by personnel of the inter-service Presidential Security Command, as well as of several ROTC units such as from the University of the Philippines System.

Historical reenactors all around the world still use the uniform in order to portray units that served in the Philippines, Cuba and Puerto Rico.

== See also ==
- Pith helmet
- Burlap
- Drill (fabric)
- Seersucker
- Serge
- Twill
