= Barack Obama tan suit controversy =

2014 fashion incident

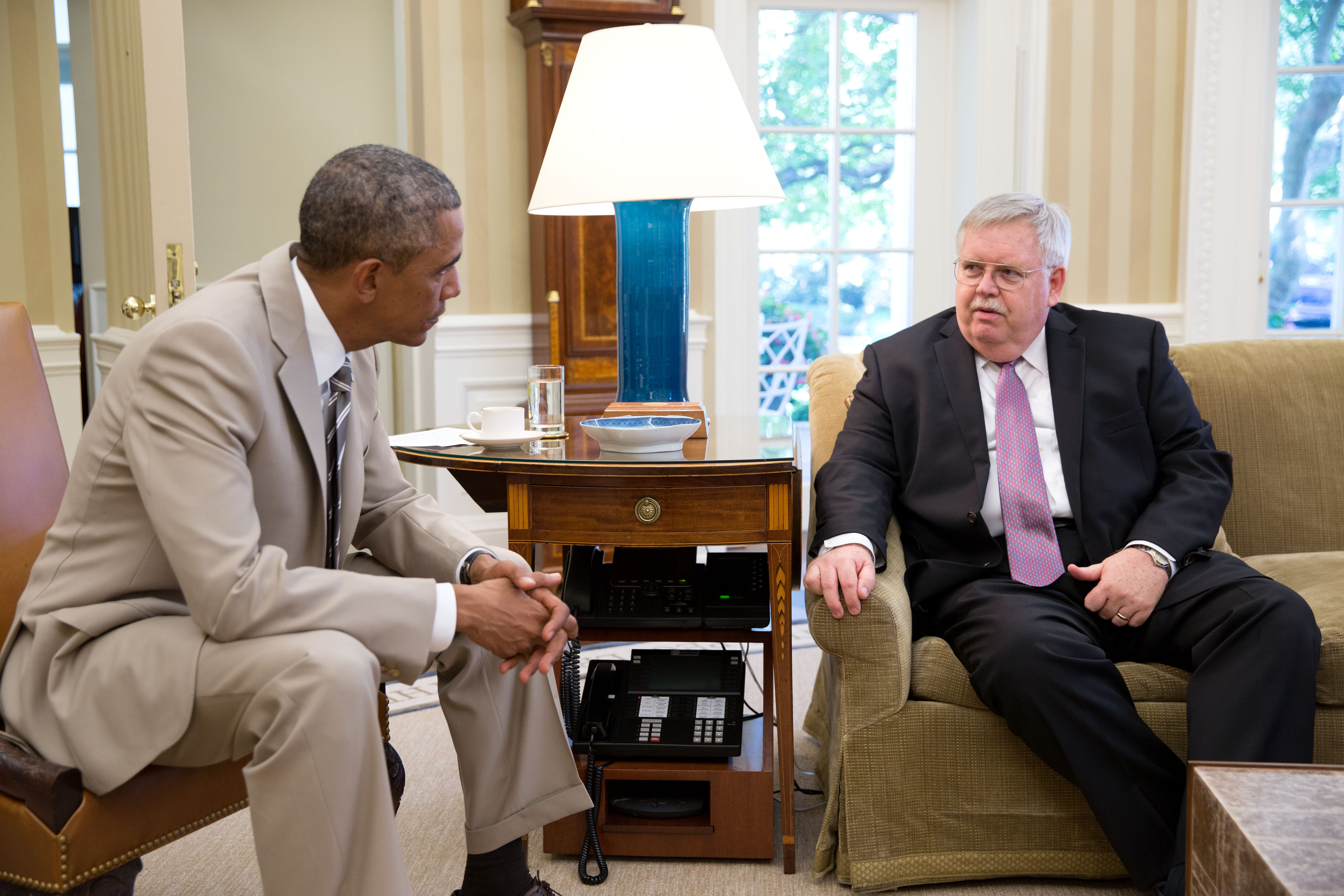
Barack Obama, in the tan suit at issue, meeting with John F. Tefft, U.S. Ambassador to Russia, in the Oval Office.

On August 28, 2014, U.S. president Barack Obama held a live press conference in which he discussed the prospect of escalating the U.S. military response to the Islamic State in Syria (ISIS). He wore a tan suit for the conference, designed by Martin Greenfield Clothiers. It received considerable attention, with whether it was appropriate for the subject matter of terrorism being discussed in the media. The issue remained prominent for several days and was widely discussed, often humorously, on television talk shows. (Note: Attributed to multiple sources:)

== Background ==
On August 28, 2014, President Barack Obama held a press conference about the situation regarding ISIS in Syria, and how the U.S. military was planning to respond to it. At the conference, Obama said that the U.S. had yet to develop a plan regarding the removal of ISIS, and talked extensively about his concerns in the region. During the conference he wore a tan suit, which until that point was uncommon for Obama.

The suit was created by Martin Greenfield Clothiers, a company owned by Holocaust survivor Martin Greenfield. Obama had picked out a tan-colored suit from his closet, asking for another of the same color. The suit was being worked on as early as March 2012, for its first public wearing on 16 June 2012. The suit, location unknown, has two pairs of pants: pleated and flat front.

Although it is common for men to wear light-colored suits in Washington during the summer due to the city's heat and humidity, it was seen by conservative commentator and Fox Business Network host Lou Dobbs as "shocking to a lot of people". The controversy was seen in the context of the slow news season before the run-up to the 2014 election campaign. The suit received mixed reviews from a sartorial perspective.

At the time, the unusual attention given to a male leader's fashion choices was contrasted with that of his 2008 Democratic rival Hillary Clinton's "regular experience" as a woman in politics.

== Immediate response ==
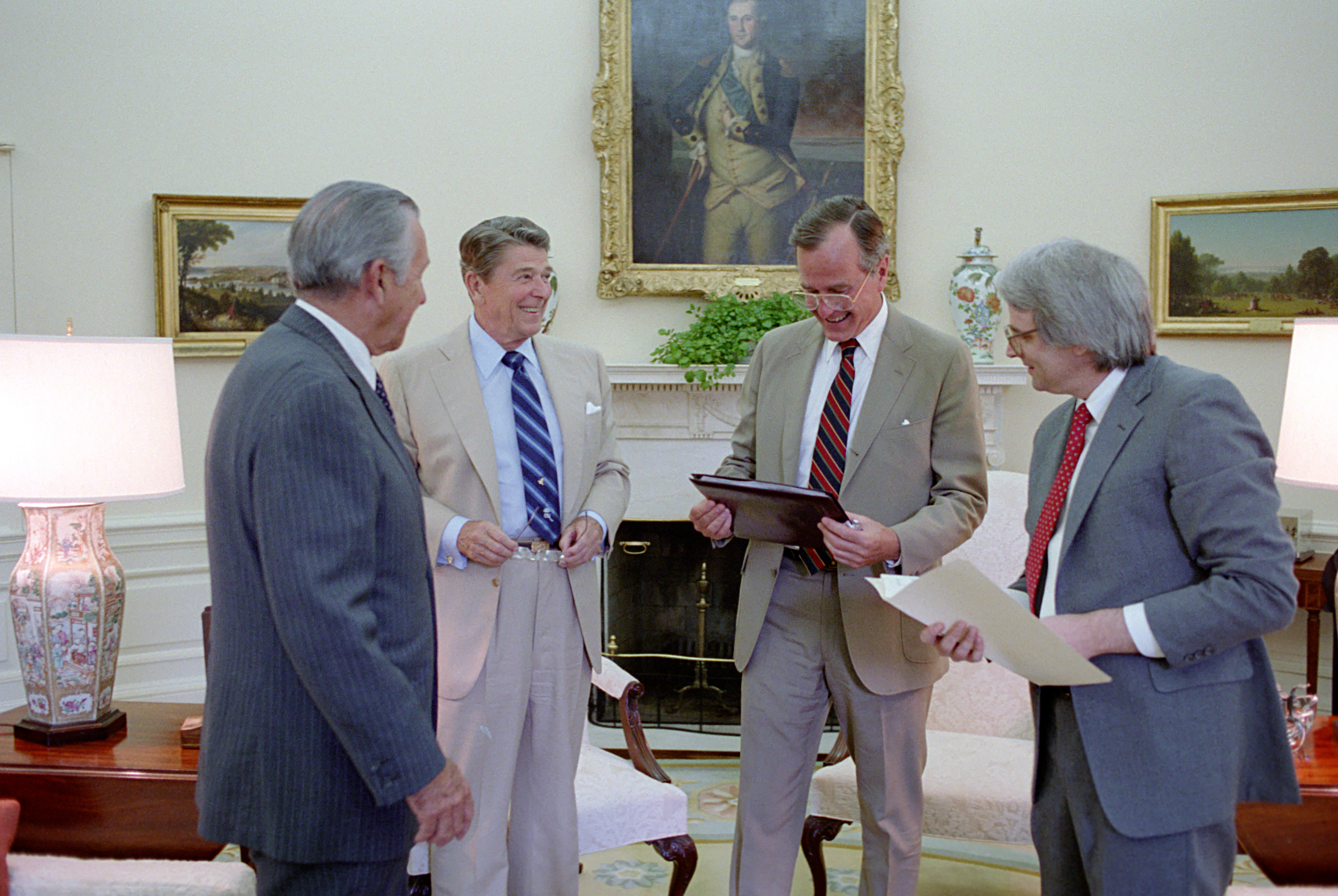
President Ronald Reagan and Vice President George H. W. Bush wearing tan suits at the White House, 1985

U.S. representative Peter King, a member of the Republican Party, deemed the suit's color combined with the subject matter of terrorism to be "unpresidential". He went on: "There's no way, I don't think, any of us can excuse what the president did yesterday. I mean, you have the world watching".

Reporters and political commentators joked about the tan suit, making a play on words of Obama's "Yes We Can" and "the audacity of hope" phrases into "yes we tan" and "the audacity of taupe." The latter phrase, a parody of Obama's book The Audacity of Hope, was recycled from media coverage of a 2010 Oval Office redecoration by Michael S. Smith which featured a prominent taupe rug and furnishings in similar muted colors, playfully criticized by Arianna Huffington among others.

Fashion journalist for the New York Times Vanessa Friedman noted that the choice of tan was a "particularly odd choice" when discussing "wishy-washy military policy" in Syria.

The day after the press conference, White House press secretary Josh Earnest said that Obama felt "pretty good" about his decision to wear the suit. Fashion designer Joseph Abboud, who had previously made suits for Obama, praised Obama for the decision, saying that "You don't want to look the same every day of your life. It's boring as hell". Multiple news outlets noted that other U.S. presidents had also worn tan suits, including Ronald Reagan and Bill Clinton. Still others said that the tan suit commentary was overshadowing the greater implications of the conference, and of the U.S. strategy for combating ISIS.

== Legacy ==
The controversy has been cited as an example of outsized attention given to a relatively insignificant detail, and as a symbol of the relatively unencumbered news cycle at the time. Obama has joked about the tan suit controversy on multiple occasions.

During the first presidency of Donald Trump, Obama's successor, the tan suit controversy was frequently referred to by Trump critics to draw a contrast between Obama and Trump. These critics contrasted the attention devoted to this trivial issue under the Obama administration with various examples of Trump's actions that broke more substantial political norms while generating less coverage, and argued that the episode illustrated how Obama's presidency was covered in comparison to Trump's.

During the week of Obama's 60th birthday in August 2021, and near the seventh anniversary of Obama's tan suit incident, President Joe Biden wore a tan suit for a press conference, which was widely reported as a jab at the initial controversy.

On September 7, 2022, at an event honoring Obama's official portraits unveiled at the White House, Obama joked about the tan suit incident.

On August 19, 2024, the first day of the 2024 Democratic National Convention, Vice President and party nominee Kamala Harris made an appearance sporting a tan suit, which was also reported as a jab at the controversy. On August 28, 2024 (on the 10th anniversary of the incident), Obama tweeted a side by side picture reference of himself and Harris in tan suits tweeting "How it started. How it's going. Ten years later, and it's still a good look! #IWillVote.com".

On June 18, 2026, at the Grand Opening Ceremony of the Obama Presidential Center in Chicago, Obama Foundation board chair Martin Nesbitt wore a tan suit while delivering his remarks at the lectern, joking that he selected this particular color in honor of the Obama tan suit controversy. David Letterman and Stephen Colbert also wore tan suits to the ceremony.

The tan suit controversy was the subject of the closing sketch of the seventh and final episode of the HBO Max comedic miniseries Life, Larry and the Pursuit of Unhappiness, of which Barack and Michelle Obama were executive producers. In it, Obama portrayed himself, and Larry David portrayed one of Obama's assistants, whose ineptness and desire to avoid responsibility for his own poor decisions led to Obama's wearing of the tan suit to the press conference.

The suit was given away during a cleaning out of Obama's closet, and who currently possesses it is unknown.

== See also ==
- Covfefe – Word used by Donald Trump on Twitter
- Seersucker Thursday – Tradition of wearing seersucker suits in the United States Senate
