= Seersucker Thursday =

Tradition of wearing seersucker suits in the United States Senate

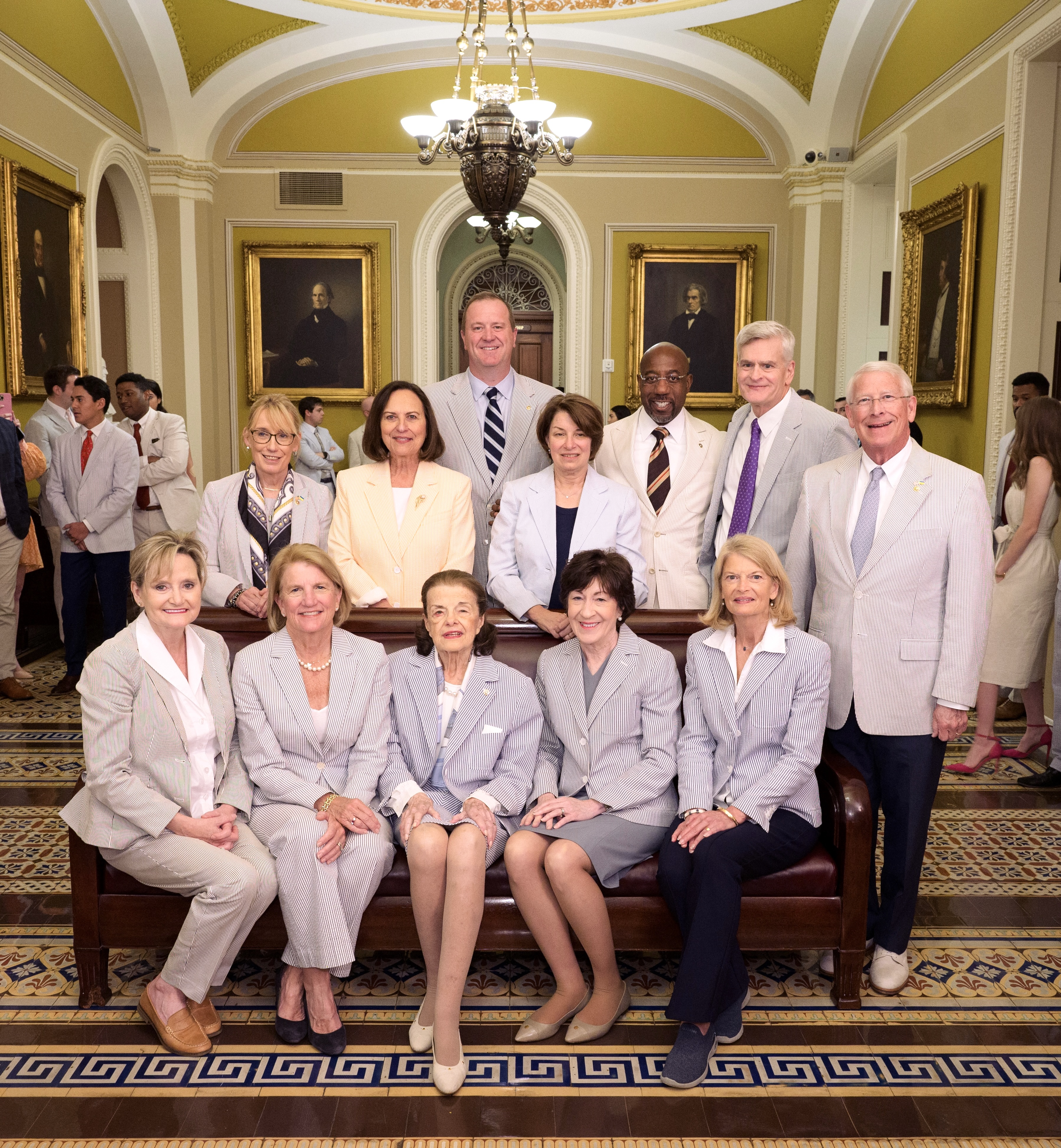
Members of the United States Senate on Seersucker Day 2023

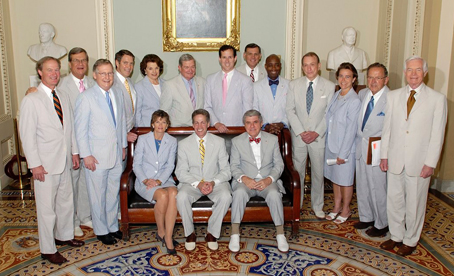
Seersucker Thursday, 2006

Seersucker Thursday is an annual tradition in the United States Congress in which senators wear clothing made of seersucker on National Seersucker Day, traditionally observed on a "'nice and warm day' in the second or third week of June". This light, cotton-based material is associated with the warm and humid climate of the Southern United States.

Seersucker Thursday was initiated by Republican Senator Trent Lott of Mississippi in 1996 who wanted to "bring a little Southern charm to the Capitol" to remind the Senate of how senators dressed before the advent of air conditioning in the 1950s. The practice was temporarily suspended in 2012 amid congressional gridlock but began again in 2015.

While National Seersucker Thursday occurs only once per year, it is not uncommon to see congressional staffers don seersucker suits on Thursdays throughout the summer.

== History of the seersucker suit ==
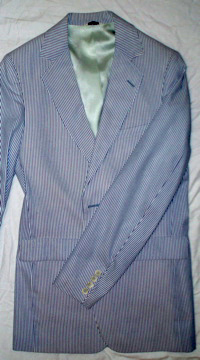
A blue and white seersucker jacket

Seersucker weave was introduced to the American South probably through British colonial trade, sometime in the second half of the 19th century. The cotton weave, which originated in western India, became a signature look of the United States in the early 20th century because its light weight and pre-rumpled surface made it ideal for the intense humidity of summer. Joseph Haspel, a New Orleans haberdasher, is credited with inventing the seersucker business suit.

The wearing of seersucker suits declined with the advent of air conditioning. By the 1950s, air conditioning reached the Capitol, ending the necessity of seersucker suits there. Gregory Peck famously wore a seersucker suit in the movie To Kill a Mockingbird, creating a cliché of how small-town Southern lawyers dressed.

== History of Seersucker Thursday ==
In 1996 Senator Trent Lott declared the first National Seersucker Day to be on a Thursday that June. His goal was to show that "the Senate isn't just a bunch of dour folks wearing dark suits and — in the case of men — red or blue ties". In 2004, Senator Dianne Feinstein decided to increase participation by encouraging women senators to follow the tradition. The following year 11 of the 14 women senators appeared on Seersucker Thursday in outfits received as gifts from Feinstein.

In 2012, Seersucker Thursday was cancelled at the last moment by Senate leaders concerned how they might appear in the face of ongoing congressional debates which would eventually culminate in the 2013 United States federal government shutdown. National Seersucker Day remained cancelled until May 27, 2015 when Senator Bill Cassidy successfully advocated for the return of Seersucker Thursday, appearances notwithstanding. Cassidy remarked, "This uniquely American fashion has a storied history dating back to 1909 ... Mr. Haspel said it best, 'hot is hot, no matter what you do for a living.'"
