= Joseph Haspel =

New Orleans haberdasher and inventor of the seersucker suit

- Born: February 18, 1884; New Orleans, Louisiana
- Died: December 29, 1959 (age 75); New Orleans, Louisiana
- Occupation: Businessman
- Known for: co-founder of Haspel Brothers, best known for seersucker suits
- Spouse: Edith Harriet Leopold (1890-1969)
- Children: Joseph Haspel Jr., Loel Richard Haspel
- Relatives: Grandchildren: Loël Mimi Haspel Gilbert, Edward Haspel, Susan Haspel, Richard Haspel, Jeffrey Haspel. Great-grandchildren: Paul Robert Gilbert Jr., John Haspel Gilbert; Ned Haspel, Tony Haspel, Andrew Haspel; Laurie Haspel Aaronson (nee Lipsey), Wendy Haspel Lipsey; Steven Haspel, Steele Haspel, Sarah Haspel; Meredith Haspel, Laura Haspel Stenslien

Joseph Haspel (February 18, 1884 – December 29, 1959) was an American haberdasher in New Orleans, Louisiana. He was the inventor of the seersucker suit, first worn by Southern businessmen, followed by Ivy League students and Northern businessmen.

== Early life ==
Joseph Haspel was born circa 1883.

== Career ==
Haspel worked as a haberdasher in New Orleans. With his brother Harry, Haspel co-founded Haspel Brothers in 1909. Within a few years, Haspel started selling seersucker suits to businessmen in the South. To promote the suits, Haspel once "walked into the sea at a Florida convention and later attended a meeting of the board of directors in the same suit. He convinced the board members that such suits were the wave of the future." By the 1920s, students at Ivy League institutions like Princeton University began wearing it. It was later adopted by businessmen in the North.

== Personal life, death and legacy ==
Haspel was married, and he had two sons. He died in 1959 in New Orleans, at age 75. By 2014, the Haspel brand was owned by his great-granddaughter, Laurie Haspel Aronson.
