= Ticking (textile) =

Type of cloth

Ticking is a type of cloth, traditionally a tightly-woven cotton or linen textile. It is traditionally used to cover tick mattresses and bed pillows. The tight weave makes it more durable and hinders the stuffing (straw, chaff, hair, down feathers, etc.) from poking through the fabric. To make it even tighter, ticking could be waxed, soaped, or starched. Tick materials designed to hold foam may be knit, or more porous. In English-speaking countries ticking commonly has a striped design, in muted colors such as brown, grey or blue, and occasionally red or yellow, against a plain, neutral background.

Although traditionally used for mattresses and pillows, the material has found other uses, such as serving as a backing for quilts, coverlets, and other bedding. It is sometimes woven with a twill weave.

Ticking is no longer restricted to a utility fabric and has found uses in interior decorating styles intending to evoke a homespun or industrial aesthetic. Modern uses for ticking include furniture upholstery, cushion covers, tablecloths, decorative basket liners, and curtains. Occasionally, lighter weight percale cloth is printed with a striped pattern made to resemble ticking fabric, and used to make garments.

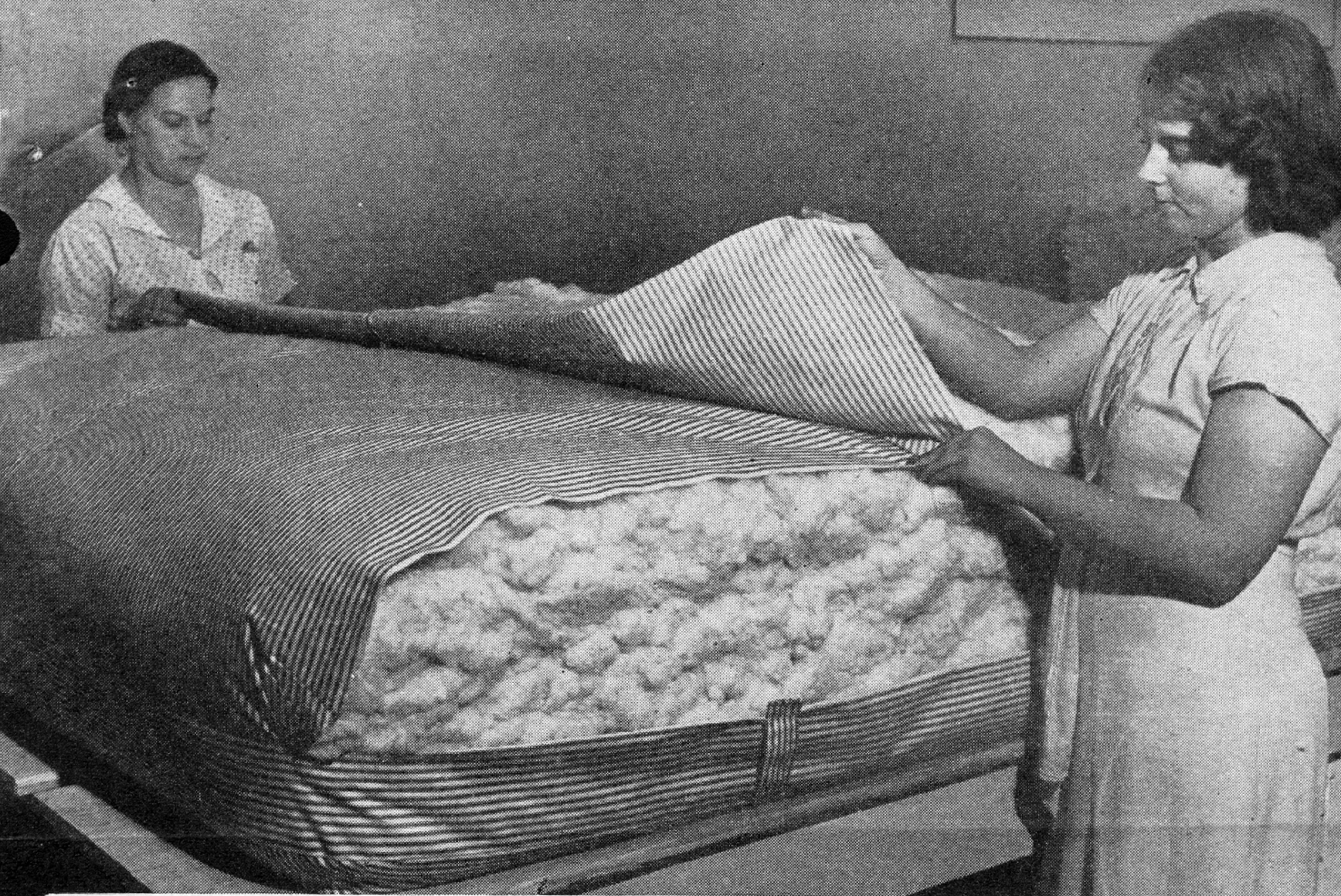
A 1940s USDA circular promoting home production of cotton mattresses.

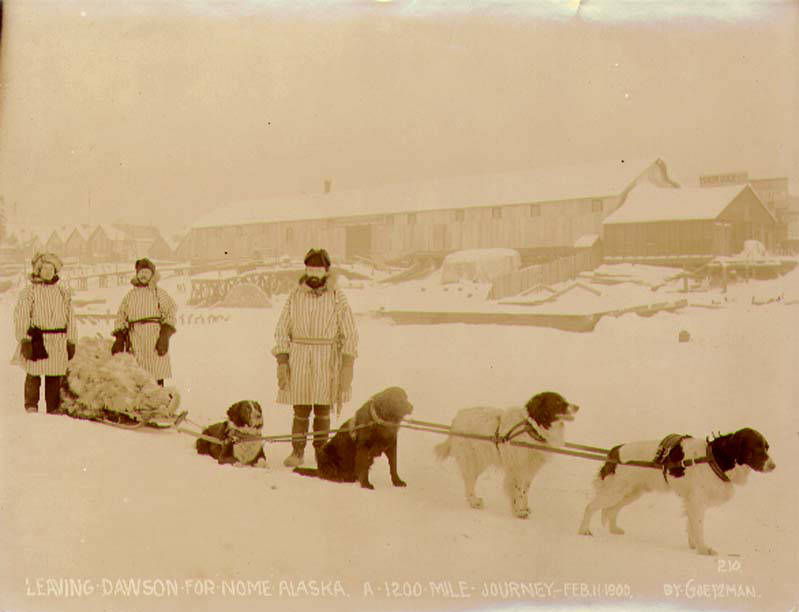
Ticking used to make windproof parkas

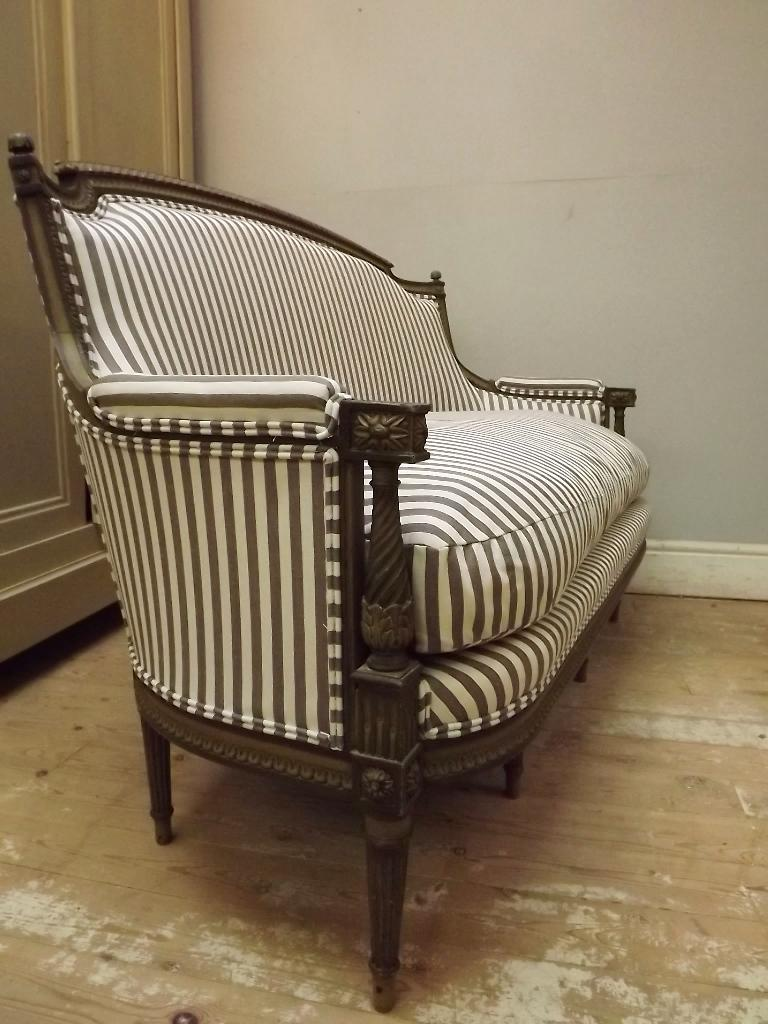
An antique settee reupholstered in ticking fabric. Historically, ticking was not used to cover fine furniture.

== See also ==
- Denim
- Drill (fabric)
- Seersucker
