= Seersucker =

Textured cotton fabric

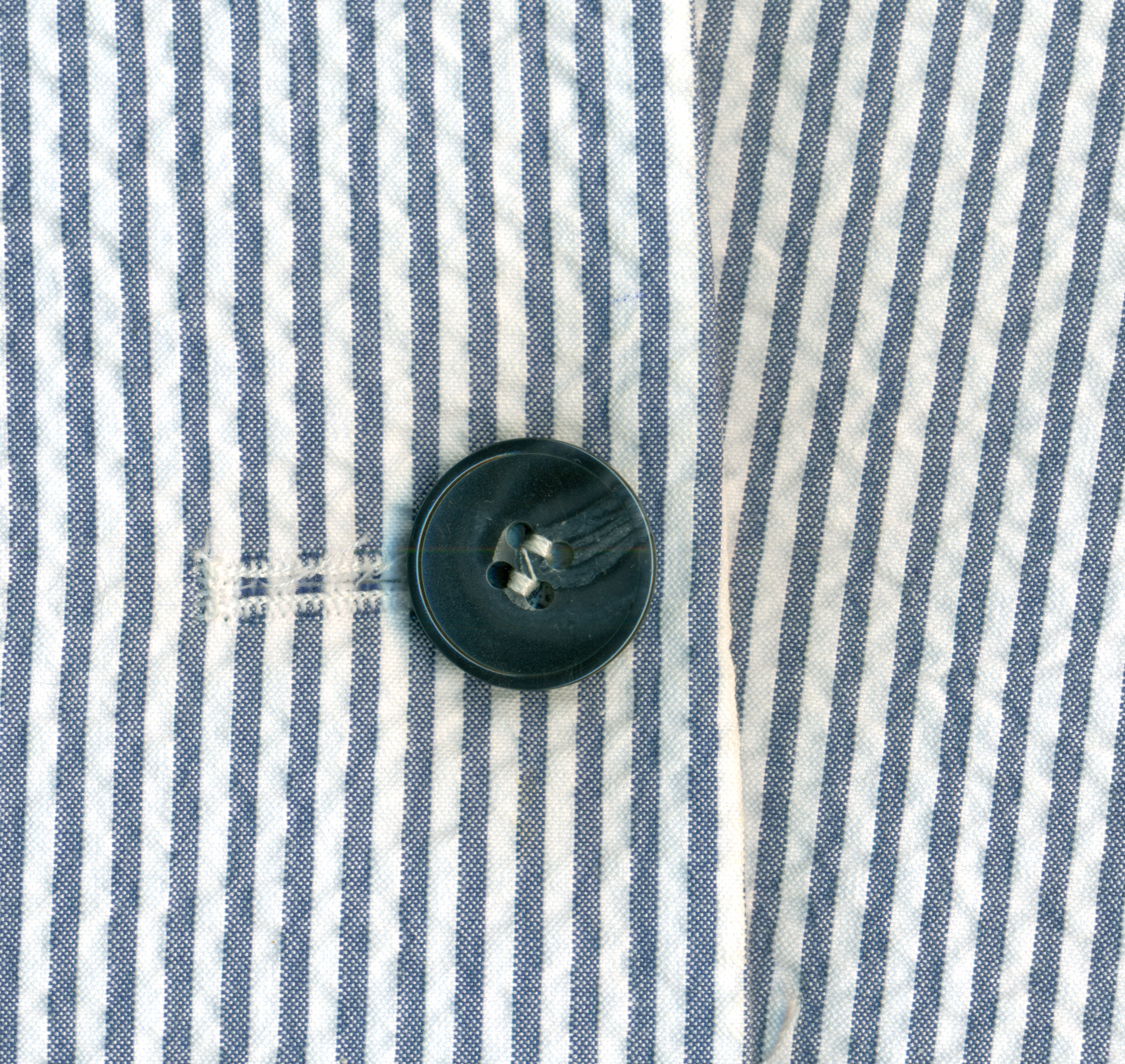
Blue and white is a common seersucker color combination.

Seersucker, hickory stripe or railroad stripe is a thin, puckered, cotton fabric, usually striped or chequered, used to make clothing for hot weather. The word originates from the Persian words shîr (شیر) and shakar (شکر), literally meaning "milk and sugar", from the gritty texture ("sugar") on the otherwise smooth ("milk") cloth. This lightweight cotton originated in India and was introduced to the wider world from there. Seersucker is woven in such a way that some threads bunch together, giving the fabric a wrinkled or puckered appearance. This effect is often achieved during weaving by feeding the warp threads for the puckered bands at a greater rate than the warp threads of the smooth stripes. (These are often of different colors but do not need to be.) The unevenness causes the fabric to be mostly held away from the skin rather than being plastered on it when wet with sweat, facilitating heat dissipation and air circulation. It also means that ironing is not necessary.

Common items made from seersucker include suits, shorts, shirts, dresses, and robes. In the United States, it is often made in white and blue stripes; however, it is produced in a wide variety of colors, usually with narrow plain and puckered stripes in different colors.

== History ==
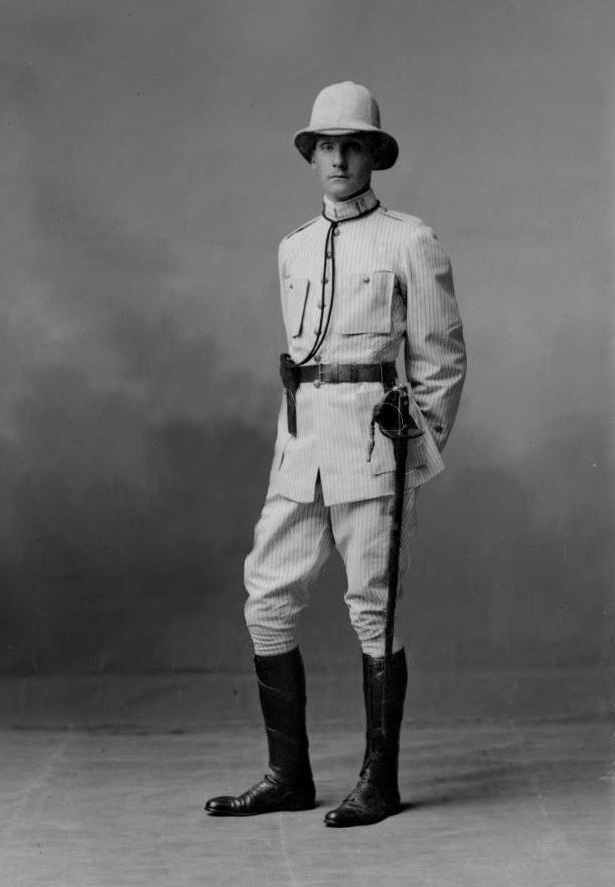
Infante Alfonso wearing a colonial rayadillo seersucker uniform, c. 1910

Seersucker originated in colonial India, taking its name from the Persian phrase shir o shekar, meaning 'milk and sugar,' referring to its mix of smooth and rough textures. At the time, it was valued as a workingman’s fabric. It was first made in the Indian subcontinent from where this fabric was exported to the European market in 17th century. English and French textile manufacturers quickly took it on and started their own production. In the 18th century the fabric was exported to the American colonies. It was durable and used in cool curtains, mattress covers, and work clothing.

Worn from the 19th century by the Spanish Army in the Philippines and later Morocco, it was known to them as rayadillo. During the British colonial period, seersucker was also a popular material in Britain's hot-weather colonies such as British India. When seersucker was introduced in the United States it was used for many garments. For suits, the material was considered a mainstay of the summer wardrobe of gentlemen, especially in the hot and humid South before air conditioning.

During the American Civil War, this material was used to make cheap but durable haversacks and some uniform items, such as the famous baggy pants of Confederate Zouaves such as the Louisiana Tigers. From the mid-Victorian era until the early 20th century, seersucker was also known as bed ticking due to its widespread use in mattresses, pillow cases and nightshirts during the hot summers in the Southern US and Britain's overseas colonies.

The fabric was originally worn by the poor in the U.S. until preppy undergraduate students began wearing it in the 1920s in an act of reverse snobbery.

Seersucker's comfort and easy laundering made it the choice of Captain Anne A. Lentz for the summer service uniforms of the first female United States Marines. Lentz was one of the first female officers selected to run the Marine Corps Women's Reserve during the Second World War. From the 1940s onwards, nurses and US hospital volunteers also wore uniforms made from a type of red and white seersucker known as candy stripe.

=== Hickory stripe ===
In the days of the Old West, a type of heavyweight indigo or navy blue seersucker known as hickory stripe was used to make the overalls, work jackets and peaked caps of train engineers and railroad workers such as George "Stormy" Kromer and Casey Jones. It was later worn by butchers and employees of the gasoline companies, most notably Standard Oil.

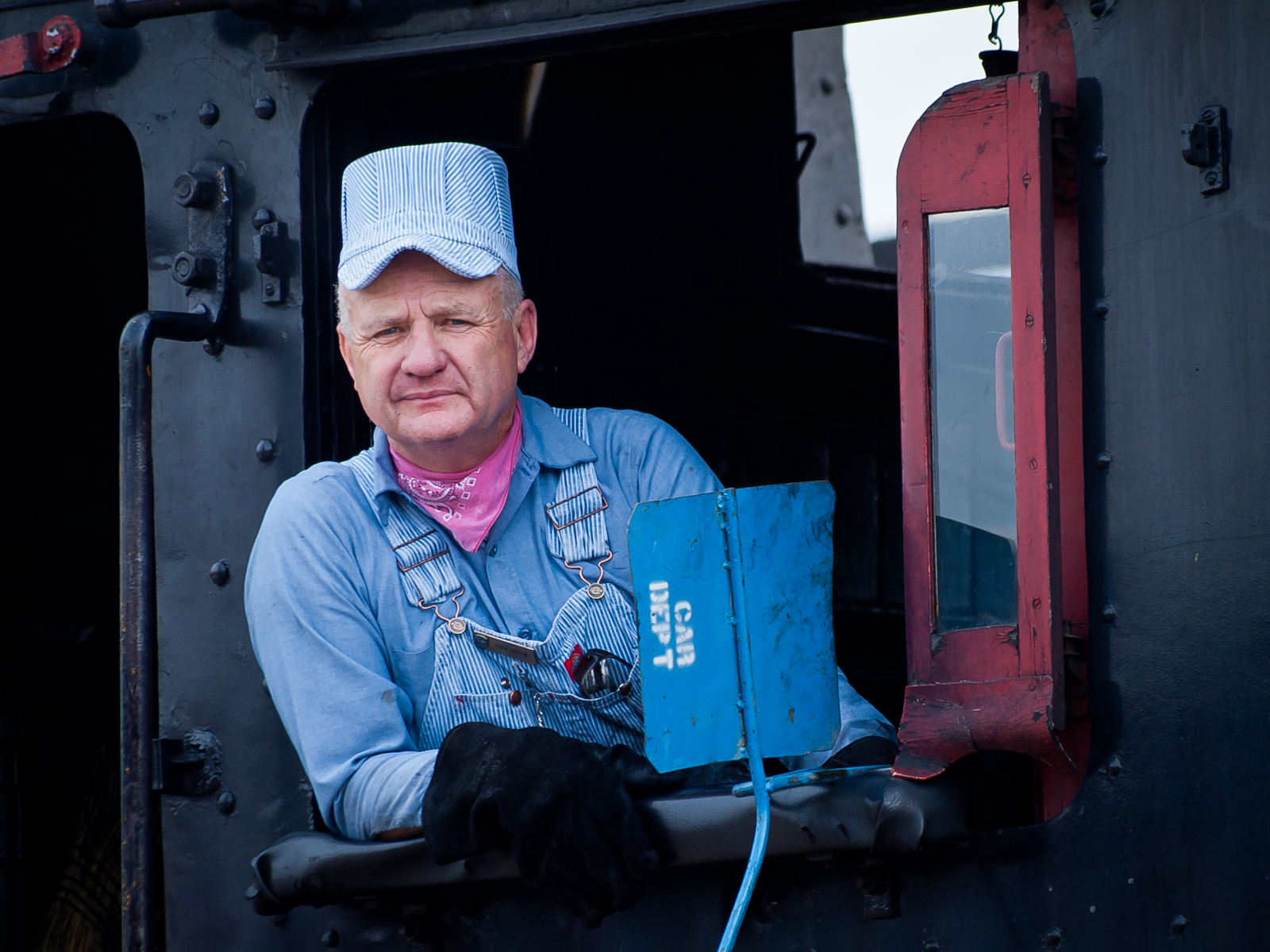
Steam locomotive driver wearing a popular shade of light blue-and-white striped seersucker overalls and engineer cap

This cotton fabric was durable like denim, cheap to produce, and kept the wearer cooler in the hot cab of the steam locomotive. Even today, the uniforms of American Union Pacific train drivers include "railroad stripe" caps based on those from the steam age.

== In fashion ==
About 1909, New Orleans clothier Joseph Haspel, Sr. started making men's suits out of seersucker fabric, which soon became regionally popular as more comfortable and practical than other types of suits for the hot and humid southern climate.

During the 1950s, college professors were known to favor full suits with red bow ties, although 1950s Ivy League and 21st century preppy students usually restricted themselves to a single seersucker garment such as a blazer paired with khaki chino trousers. Menswear brands famous for manufacturing seersucker at this time included Brooks Brothers, Macy's, Sears, and Joseph Haspel of New Orleans.

In the 1970s, seersucker trousers were popular among young urban African Americans seeking to connect to their rural American heritage. The fabric made a comeback among teenage girls in the 1990s, and again in the 2010s.

Beginning in 1996, the US Senate held a Seersucker Thursday in June, where the participants dress in traditionally Southern clothing, but the tradition was discontinued in June 2012. It was revived by members of the US Senate in 2014.

=== 2010 to present ===
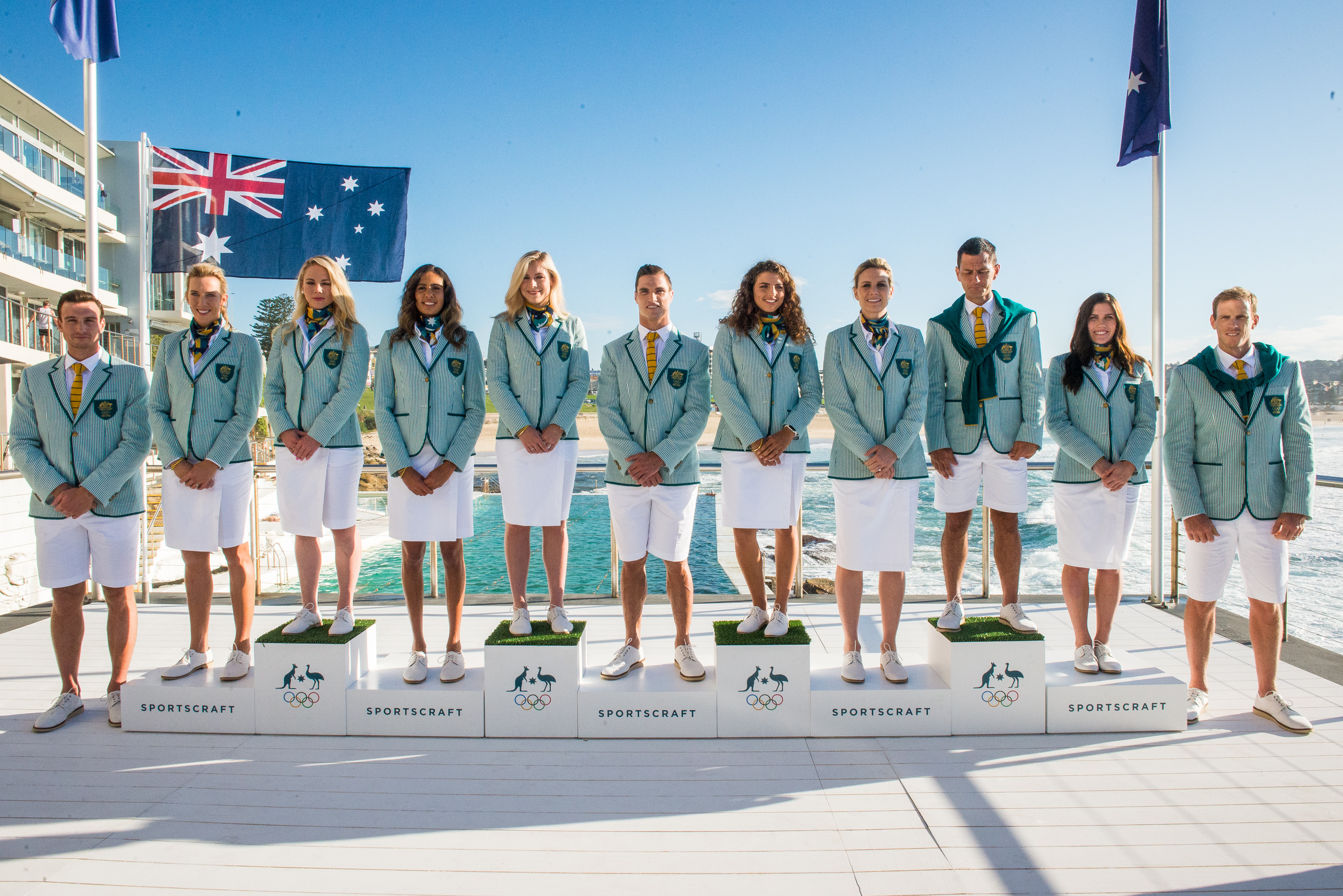
Australian Olympic athletes in 2016

Although pale blue and dark blue stripes remained the most popular choice, alternative colors included green, red, black, grey, beige, yellow, orange, purple, pink, and brown. The traditional two-button blazer was updated with a slimmer cut and Edwardian-inspired lapel piping, and double-breasted jackets became available during the mid-2010s. Since 2010, "Seersucker Social" events have been held in major cities across the United States, where participants wear vintage clothes and ride vintage bicycles. Such events are the summer equivalent of a Tweed Run, which is traditionally held in the fall.

In the 2016 Olympics hosted by Brazil, the Australian Olympic team received green and white seersucker blazers and Toms Shoes rather than the traditional dark green with gold trim. At the same time, seersucker pants, skirts, espadrilles, blouses, and even bikinis were worn as casual attire by many fashion conscious young women in America.

== Weaving process ==
Seersucker is made by slack-tension weave. The threads are wound onto the two warp beams in groups of 10 to 16 for a narrow stripe. The stripes are always in the warp direction and on grain. Today, seersucker is produced by a limited number of manufacturers. It is a low-profit, high-cost item because of its slow weaving speed.

== Gallery ==
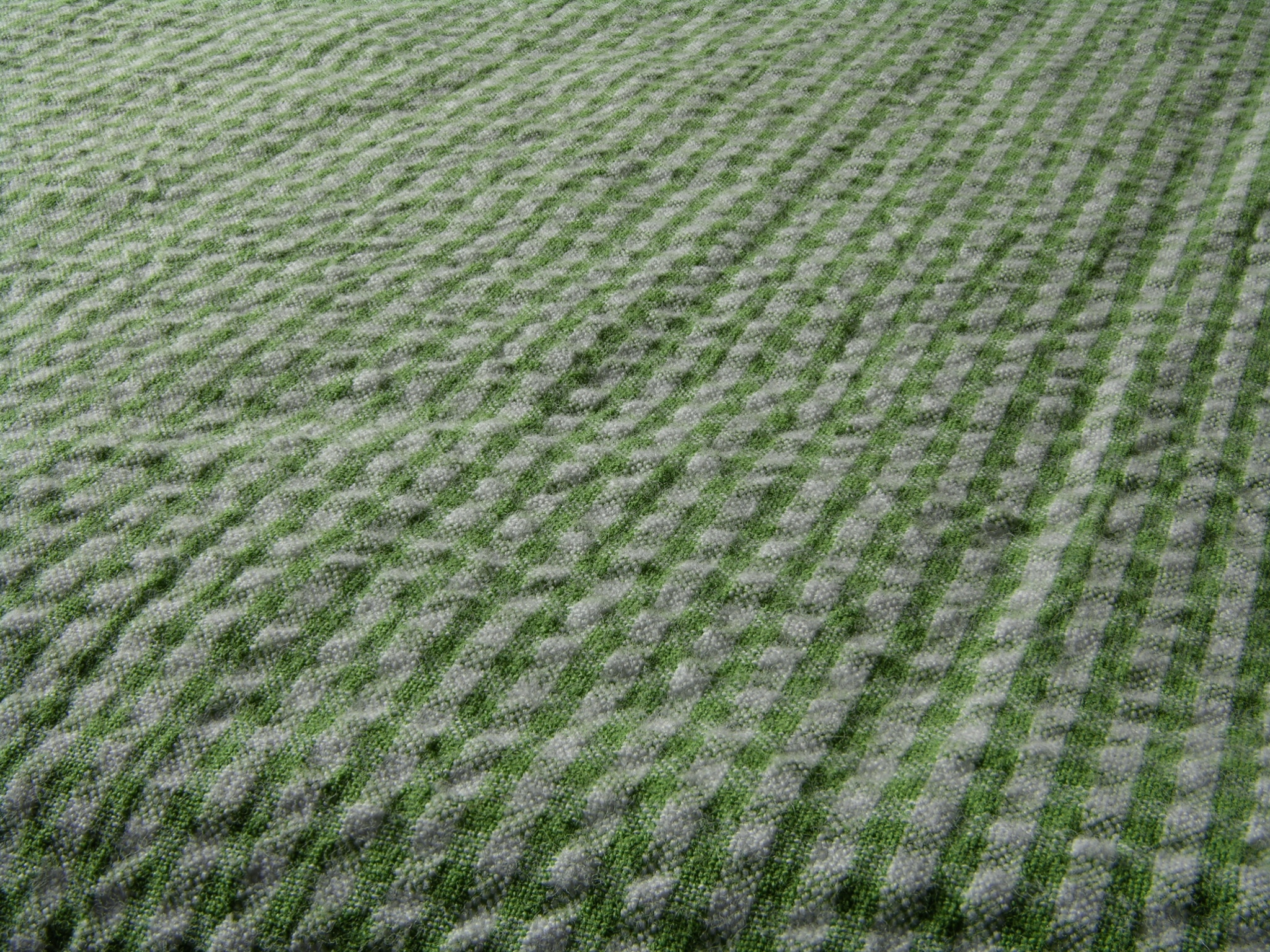
Green/white checkered seersucker fabric

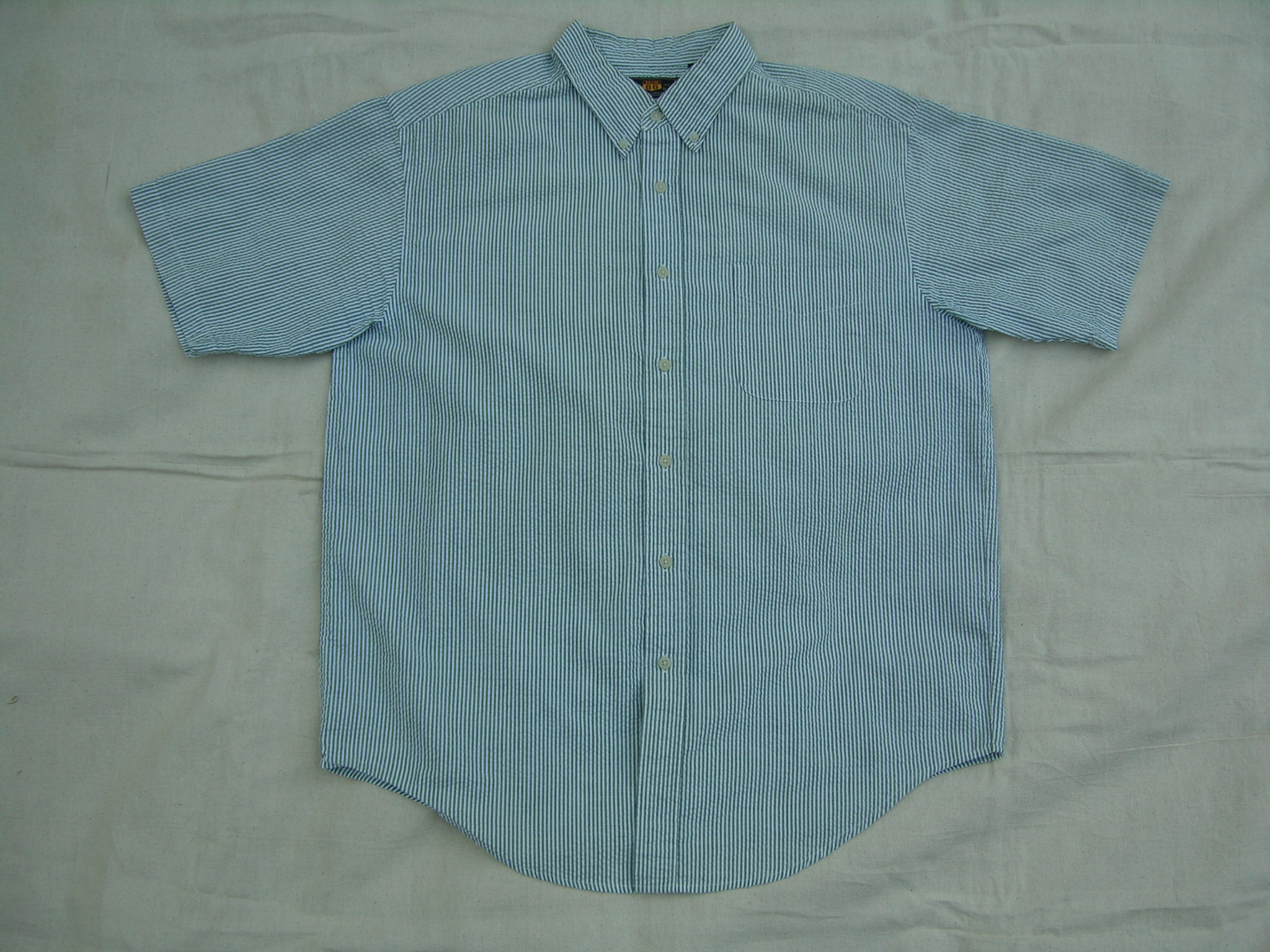
Shirt from green/white seersucker fabric

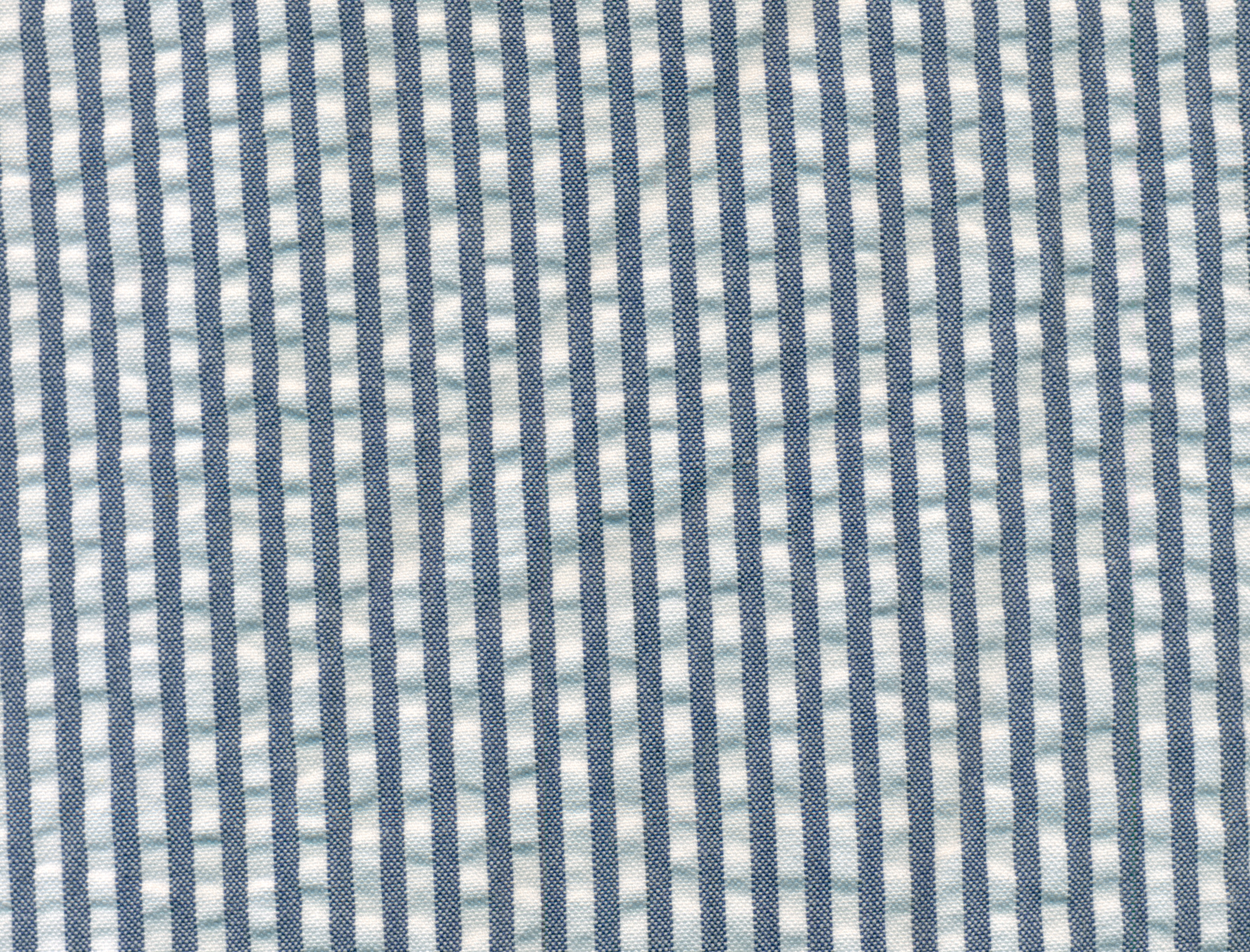
Blue/white striped seersucker fabric

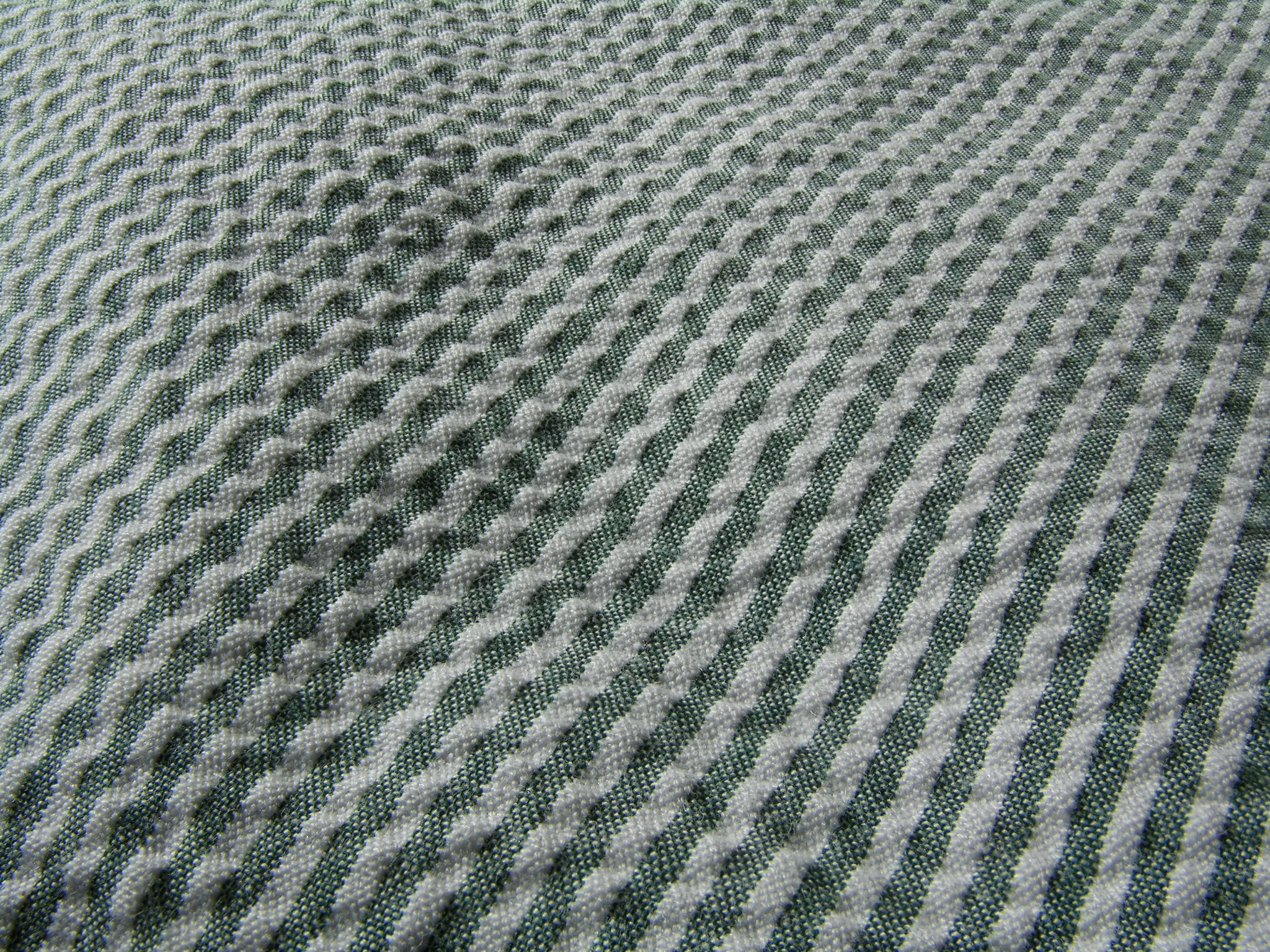
Green/white striped seersucker fabric

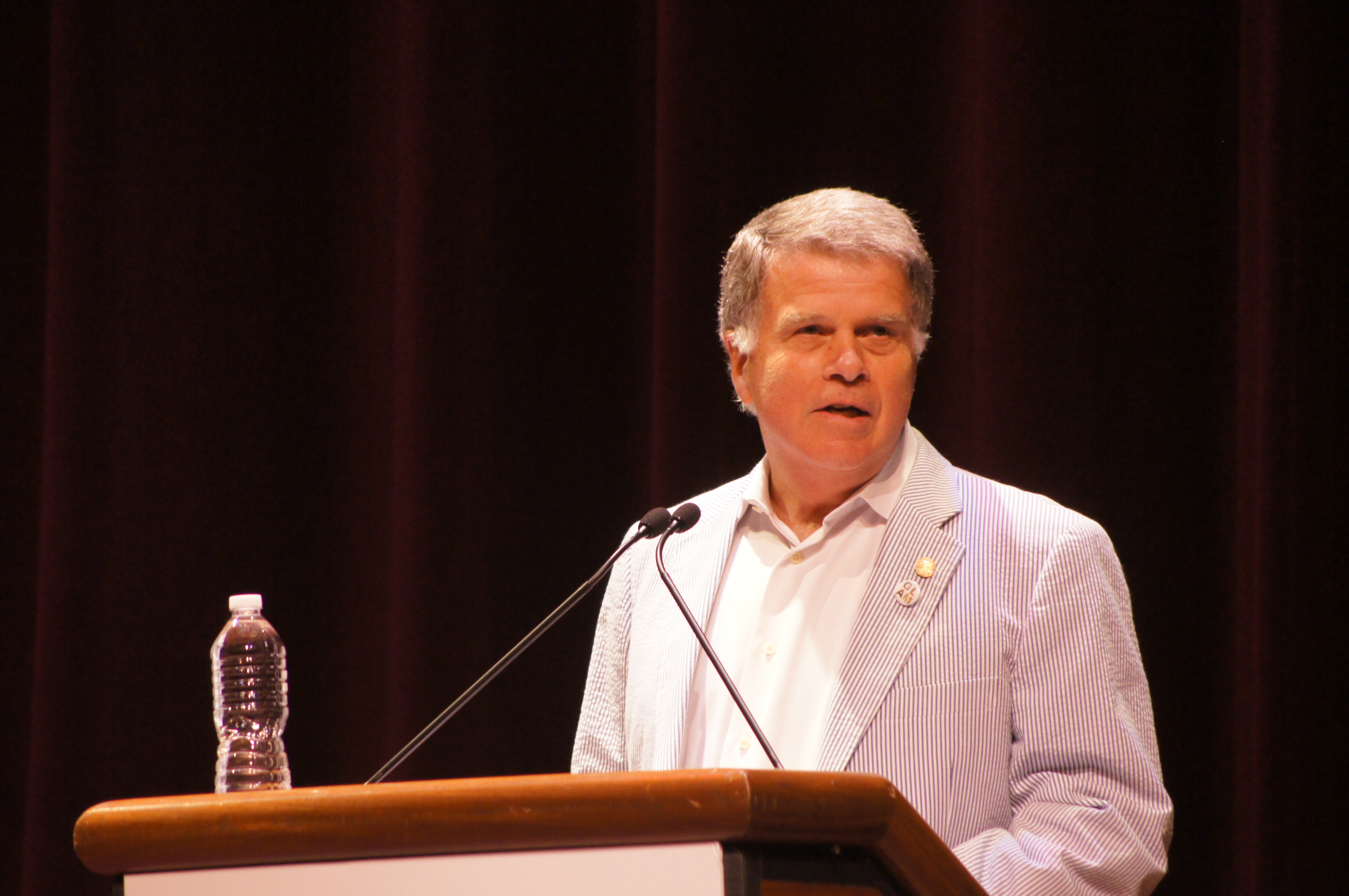
David Ferriero, speaking at Wikimania 2012, wearing a seersucker suit

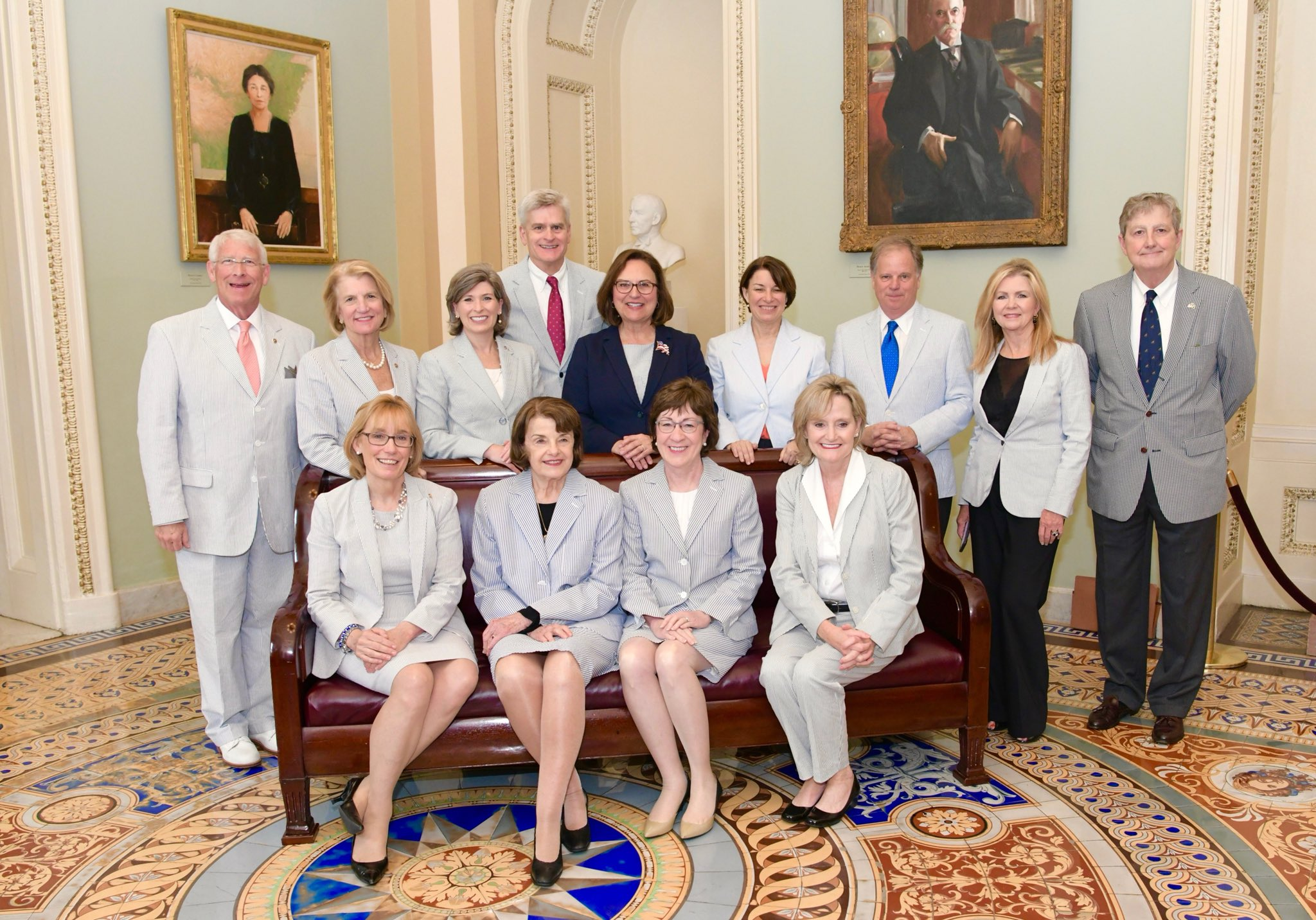
Members of the United States Senate on Seersucker Day 2019

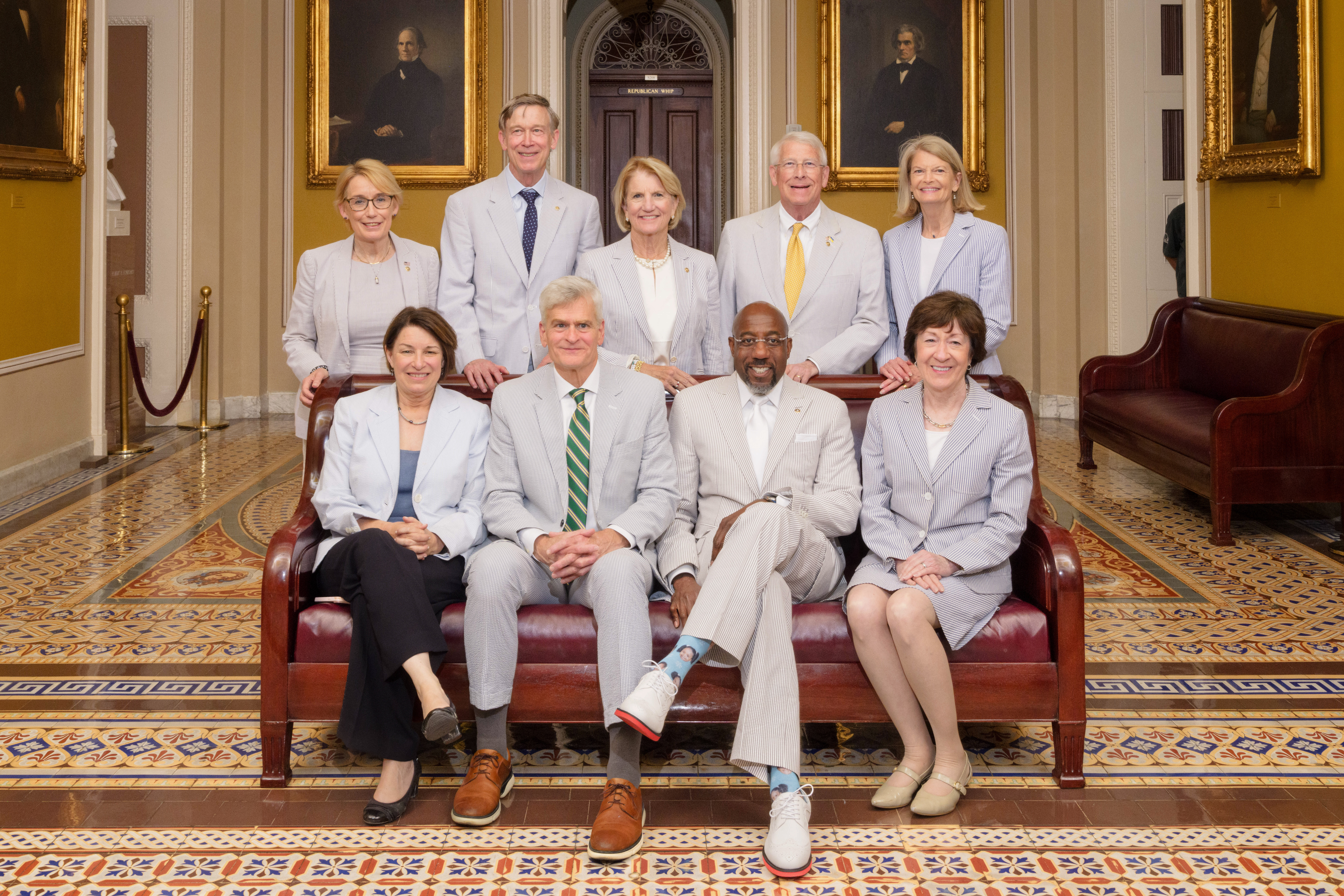
US Senators on Seersucker Thursday 2024

== See also ==
- Rayadillo
