= Drill (fabric) =

Sturdy warp-faced left-hand twill cotton fabric

Drill is stout, durable cotton fabric with a strong bias (diagonal) in the weave. It can be used unbleached, although it is more often bleached or dyed.

== Use in clothing ==
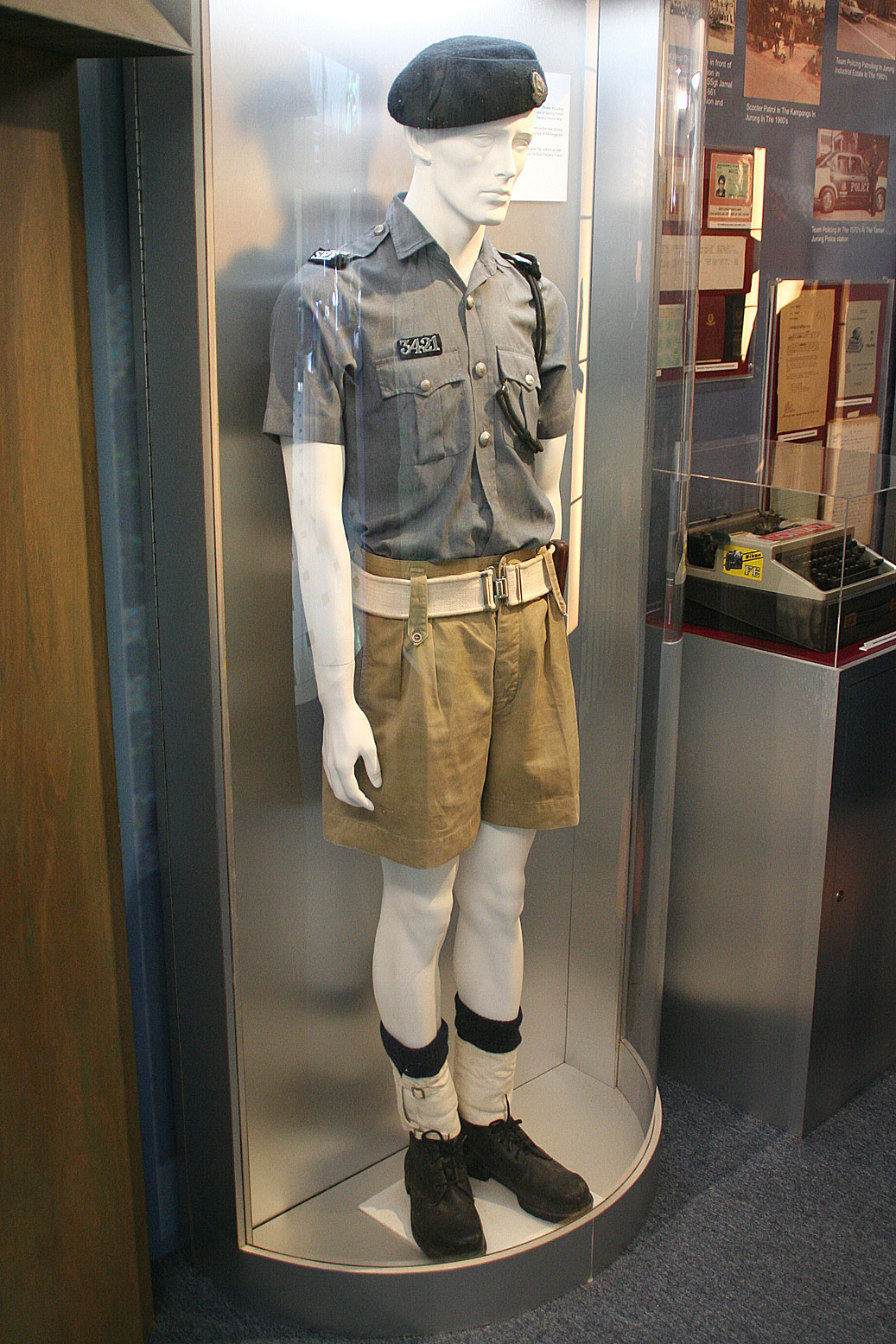
Old khaki police uniform at Jurong Police Division Headquarters

Light weight drill is used in clothing items such as shirts, safari jackets, blouses, and some types of sports clothing. The heavier weights were often used in corsets, and are commonly used in work clothing and uniforms.

The most common use of drill in uniforms and casual wear is in the form of khaki drill. Learning from this practice, British troops took to dyeing their white drill uniforms to obtain more serviceable campaign clothing; this practice became widespread during the crisis of the Indian Mutiny. Initially, improvised dyes produced clothing that ranged in shade from lavender grey to earth brown, although all were referred to as "khaki". In the mid-1880s, standardised cotton drill uniforms were produced using a colourfast mineral dye of the shade now recognised universally as khaki. The fabric soon became a popular material for military uniforms, and in the United States following World War II, as veterans returned to college campuses, it became popular in casual dress as well.

== Other uses ==
Drill is a versatile fabric that has been used in a variety of applications. Boat sail drill is a lightweight, unbleached drill used to make sails for sailing craft. Although duck (canvas) was more commonly used for these purposes, drill has also been used to make tarpaulins, tents, awnings and canopies, but the use of both fabrics has been supplanted in modern times with synthetic fabrics. Like duck, drill is used as a covering for furniture and cushions.

== See also ==
- Ticking (textile)
