= Neva (disambiguation) =

The Neva River is a river in northwestern Russia.

Neva may also refer to:

== Places ==
- Neva, Mazandaran, a village in Iran
- Neva, Wisconsin, a town in Langlade County, Wisconsin, United States, or an unincorporated community within it
- Neva Shoal, a shoal in Hawaii
- Mount Neva (Colorado)
- Mount Neva (Nevada)
- Neva Bay, the easternmost part of the Gulf of Finland
- Neva (Italy), a short river in Liguria, Italy

== Military ==
- Neva, a Russian codename for the Soviet S-125 Neva/Pechora surface-to-air missile system
- Battle of the Neva, a 1240 battle which may not have taken place
- Battle of the Neva (1708), during the Swedish invasion of Russia

== People ==
- Neva (name), a list of people with either the given name or surname

== Other uses ==
- Neva (1802 Russian ship), a ship originally called Thames, purchased and renamed by the Russians
- Neva (1813 ship), a three-masted English barque
- Nihon Ethics of Video Association, also known as "Viderin"/"Biderin", a former ratings organization of the Japanese video industry
- Neva (horse), a British Thoroughbred racehorse
- Neva Cup, a professional women's tennis tournament in Russia
- Neva Foundation, a Swiss non-profit organization promoting cultural and scientific exchanges between Russia and Switzerland
- Neva (magazine), a Russian monthly literary magazine first published in 1955
- Neva Towers, a building complex consisting of two skyscrapers in Moscow, Russia
- Neva (video game) a 2024 puzzle-platforming video game

== See also ==
- Newar (disambiguation) or Newa, a people of Nepal
