= Mount Neva =

Mount Neva may refer to:

- Mount Neva (Colorado)
- Mount Neva (Nevada)
