= DJ College of Dental Sciences and Research =

Dental college in Uttar Pradesh

Coordinates: 25.352229°N 78.801565°E

DJ College of Dental Sciences and Research is a dental college located in Modinagar in the nagar panchayat of Niwari in Ghaziabad district in the Indian state of Uttar Pradesh. The founder and chairman is Ajit Singh Jassar. It has students from 17 different nations and is affiliated to Dr. Bhimrao Ambedkar University of Agra. It is recognised by the Dental Council of India (DCI), New Delhi. The college was established in 1999 by Jassar Dental Medical Education Health foundation, which is a registered Public Charitable society. It is a Sikh minority institute.

The college offers undergraduate and postgraduate courses in the field of dentistry – Bachelor of Dental Surgery (BDS), Master of Dental Surgery (MDS), Diploma level courses and a course in Nursing.

The college publishes the Journal of Orofacial & Health Sciences.

== See also ==
- List of dental colleges in India
