= Niwari =

Niwari may refer to these places in India:

- Niwari, Madhya Pradesh
- Niwari, Uttar Pradesh
- Niwari district, Madhya Pradesh
- Niwari (Vidhan Sabha constituency), Madhya Pradesh

== See also ==
- Niwar (disambiguation)
