= Gediminas Gelgotas =

Lithuanian composer (born 1986)

- Born: Gediminas Gelgotas; June 12, 1986 (age 39); Vilnius, Lithuania
- Genres: Contemporary classical music, minimal music
- Occupations: Composer, conductor
- Instruments: Piano, trumpet
- Years active: 2004–present
- Labels: Peermusic, Naïve Records, Deutsche Grammophon
- Website: www.gediminasgelgotas.com

Gediminas Gelgotas (born 12 June 1986 in Vilnius) is a Lithuanian composer, conductor and self-performing artist.

Gelgotas' music is known to captivate younger and new audiences of classical music. The composer made his most recent international debuts with his symphonic scores at Berlin Konzerthaus (2012), Schleswig-Holstein Music Festival (2013), Leipzig Gewandhaus (2015), Zurich Tonhalle (2015), Kissinger Sommer Festival (2018), as well as other prestigious concert halls and festivals. His works have been presented by major broadcasters in Europe and Worldwide, including Classic FM, Mezzo TV, BBC World Service, BR Klassik, Radio France, WQXR and others.

== Early life ==
He was born in Vilnius, Lithuania on 12 June 1986 and grew up in a family of musicians. His mother is a choir conductor at Vilnius University, his father a member of the Lithuanian National Symphony Orchestra, professor at the Lithuanian Academy of Music and Theatre. His siblings are also musicians. (Brother Giedrius Gelgotas – flutist, sister Justė Gelgotaitė – oboist).

At the age of seven, Gelgotas enrolled at the M. K. Čiurlionis School of Art where he studied piano, trumpet and composition. He graduated from the Lithuanian Academy of Music and Theatre, where he studied composition and orchestral conducting, as well as the Hochschule für Musik und Theater Hamburg, where he studied composition with Peter Michael Hamel.

== Life and Works ==
Never Ignore the Cosmic Ocean

Never Ignore the Cosmic Ocean is a piece for symphony orchestra by Gediminas Gelgotas written in 2011 originally for a smaller string ensemble. The symphonic version was premiered at the Berlin Konzerthaus with the Baltic Sea Philharmonic (formerly Baltic Youth Philharmonic) conducted by Kristian Järvi at the Young Euro Classic Festival on 11 August 2012. The minimalist composition reflects his consistent way of personally dealing with intellectual worlds and creative processes. "The new composition by the Lithuanian composer Gediminas Gelgotas caused a sensation!"

On 1 September 2013, the work was broadcast widely on German radio stations, and since September 2015 it is aired regularly on Mezzo TV in Europe and Asia. Never Ignore the Cosmic Ocean is also released by the independent French music label Naïve. This particular opus soon started to migrate throughout European festivals and turned out to be a reference point for the international career of Gelgotas.

Symphony No.1 Extracultural

Extracultural is the first symphony by Gediminas Gelgotas written in 2014-2015. It is scored for a symphony orchestra and an ensemble (voice, piano, electronics and strings). The world premiere of Extracultural took place at the Gewandhaus concert hall in Leipzig, on 17 January 2015 and has culminated with standing ovations and great reviews. The first performance in Lithuania was during the opening gala of the XIXth International Vilnius Festival half a year later. Both of the premieres were conducted by Kristjan Järvi. They were performed by the MDR Radio Orchestra in Leipzig, where Järvi is the artistic director and chief conductor, and by the Lithuanian National Symphony Orchestra in Vilnius. Gelgotas' ensemble NICO performed in both premieres with the composer himself on stage.

The piece consists of four main movements: Higher Energy, Sacred Unreligious Soul, Transitory, Sanctifaction and eight smaller episodes: Introduction, Contemporary Music, Modulation 1, Modulation 2, Pre–Sanctifaction, Bridge X, Cadenza. The duration of the piece is approximately 42 minutes.

Mountains. Waters. (Freedom)

Mountains. Water. (Freedom) is a piece for symphony orchestra by Gediminas Gelgotas written in 2015. It was commissioned by the Swiss Orpheum Foundation and premiered in September 2015 at the Zurich Tonhalle by Kristjan Järvi conducting Baltic Sea Philharmonic. From February 2017 Mountains. Waters. (Freedom) is broadcast regularly by Mezzo TV in Europe and Asia.

Violin Concerto No.1

Gelgotas‘ first Violin Concerto was written in 2017-2018 and commissioned by Swiss violinist David Nebel. The premiere took place at the Kissinger Sommer Festival, on 7 July 2018, played by David Nebel, Kristjan Järvi and the Baltic Sea Philharmonic. The work received high interest prior to and after the premiere, including broadcasts and interviews by BR Klassik, as well as publications including the Violin Channel and German press. German newspaper Main Post wrote: "The Lithuanian Gelgotas unfolds wide spaces in the large orchestra, densely woven from tight intervals. Staggered slight changes in the often blocky, fine-rhythmic, even static events achieve delicate, sometimes even dramatic reverb effects. <...> Striking colour and idyll <...> as if the composer had overheard nature <...>."

== Recognition and Acclaim ==
To date, Gelgotas‘ music has been presented at many prestigious classical music festivals and concerts halls across Europe including the Kissinger Sommer, Merano Music Festival, Beethovenfest, Schleswig-Holstein, Young Euro Classics, Usedom music festivals, as well as Théâtre des Champs-Élysées Paris, Berlin Konzerthaus, Zurich Tonhalle, Helsinki Music Centre, Mariinski Theatre in St. Petersburg and Tchaikovsky Hall in Moscow amongst others prestigious venues.

Gelgotas’ works have been recently performed by conductors Kristjan Järvi and Martynas Stakionis, violinists Mari Samuelsen, Lidia Baich, Kristīne Balanas, David Nebel, cellist Vytautas Sondeckis, double-bassist Roman Patkoló, singer Asmik Grigorian and trumpeter Ole Edvard Antonsen.

Gelgotas was the composer in residence at Verbier Festival in 2014 where he was presented with Neva Foundation Prize.

Gelgotas' music has been presented by many major broadcasters in Europe and Worldwide, including Classic FM, Mezzo TV, BBC World Service, BR Klassik, Radio France and others.

== Composed works ==
- Violin concerto no.1 for violin solo and symphony orchestra (June 2018)
- Sanctifaction (from Symphony No.1 'Extracultural') piece for cello and piano (2015-2018)
- Sanctifaction (from Symphony No.1 'Extracultural') piece for doublebass and piano (2015-2018)
- Mountains. Waters. (Freedom) piece for symphony orchestra (September 2015)
- Mountains. Waters. (Freedom) piece for piano and string orchestra (September 2015)
- Symphony No.1 'Extracultural' for symphony orchestra and soloensemble (strings, piano, voice and electronics) (December 2014)
- Never Ignore the Cosmic Ocean piece for symphonyorchestra (2011-2013)
- Never Ignore the Cosmic Ocean piece for violin solo and piano (2011-2013)
- X 21,3 piece for symphony orchestra (December 2010)
- What's Unrobotizable piece for string quartet (April 2010)
- Echoes For A Thousand Years piece for string orchestra (October 2009)
- An End Is A Beginning piece for eight strings (May 2009)
- Body Language piece for eight strings (5 vln, 2 vla, vc) and voice (August 2008)
- Septet for string Quartet, flute, oboe and clarinet (May 2008)
- Am I Exist piece for five strings (4 violins and cello), voice and female choir (March 2008)
- To The Skies piece for voice solo (also versions for: violin solo, cello solo, viola solo, trumpet solo, flute solo) (January 2008)
- To The Skies song for voice & piano (January 2008)
