= Niwar (disambiguation) =

Niwar may refer to

- Niwar, town in Madhya Pradesh, India
- Niwar (cotton tape), a type of thick cotton tape in India

== See also ==
- Niwari (disambiguation)
- Newar (disambiguation)
