= Mount Jasper =

Mountain in the state of Colorado

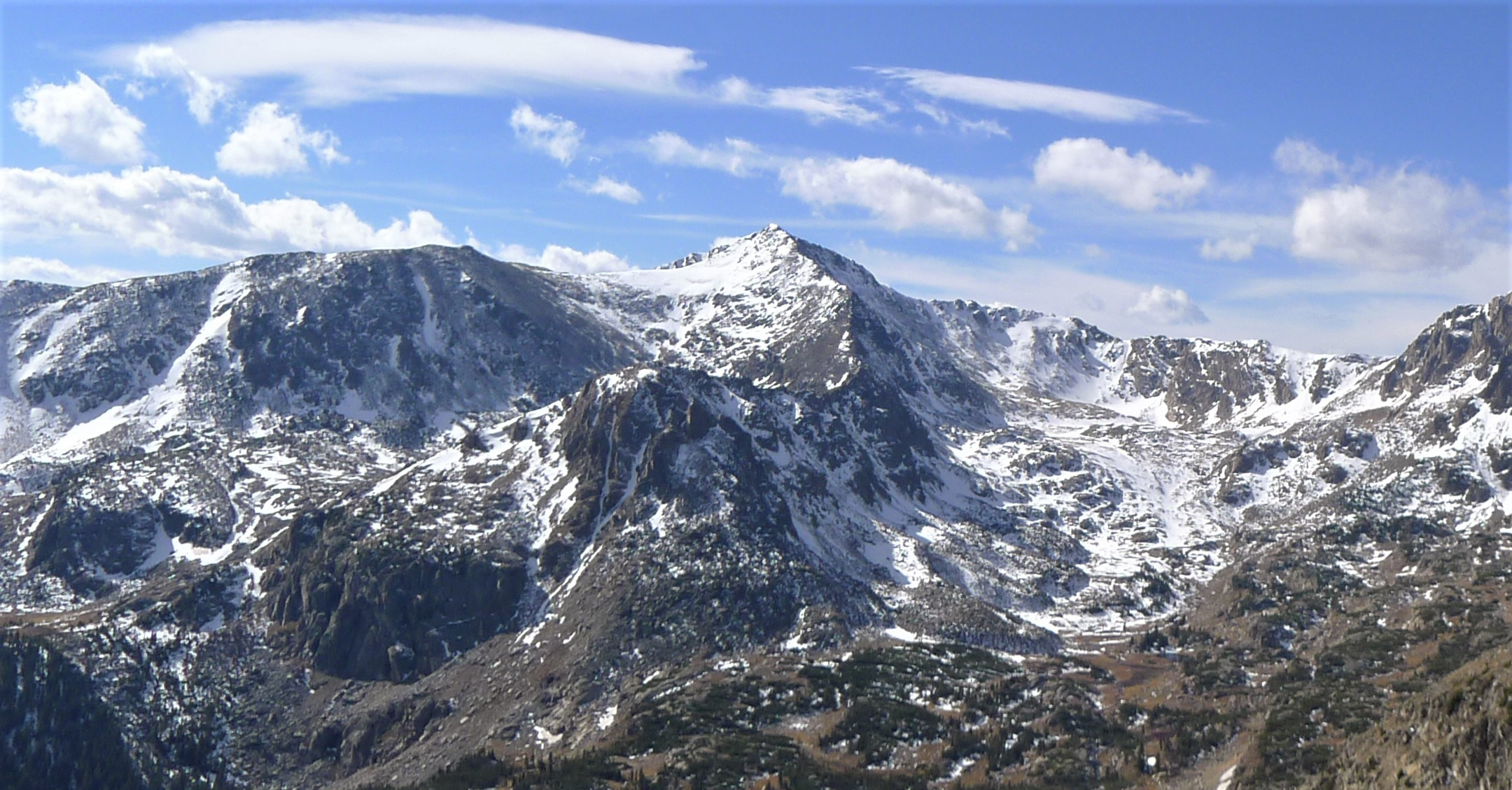
- Northeast aspect

Highest point
- Elevation: 12,923 ft (3,939 m)
- Prominence: 1,011 ft (308 m)
- Parent peak: North Arapaho Peak (13,508 ft)
- Isolation: 2.80 mi (4.51 km)
- Coordinates: 39°59′41″N 105°40′59″W

Geography
- Location within Colorado Location within the United States
- Country: United States
- State: Colorado
- County: Boulder County / Grand County
- Protected area: Indian Peaks Wilderness
- Parent range: Rocky Mountains; Front Range
- Topo map: USGS East Portal

Climbing
- Easiest route: Hiking class 2

Mount Jasper is a 12,923-foot (3,939 m) mountain summit on the boundary shared by Boulder County and Grand County, in Colorado, United States.

== Description ==
Mount Jasper is set on the Continental Divide in the Front Range which is a subrange of the Rocky Mountains. The mountain is located 23 miles (37 km) west of Boulder in the Indian Peaks Wilderness, on land managed by Arapaho National Forest and Roosevelt National Forest. Precipitation runoff from the mountain's east slopes drains into Jasper Creek and Boulder Creek, whereas the west slope drains to Fraser River via Cabin Creek. Topographic relief is modest as the summit rises 2,100 feet (640 m) above Jasper Lake in two miles (3.2 km) and 3,000 feet (914 m) above Cabin Creek in two miles. An ascent of the peak involves hiking seven miles (11 km) with 3,010 feet (917 m) of elevation gain. The mountain's toponym was officially adopted in 2003 by the United States Board on Geographic Names. Prior to that, it was called Jasper Peak.

== Climate ==
According to the Köppen climate classification system, the mountain is located in an alpine subarctic climate zone with cold, snowy winters, and cool to warm summers. Due to its altitude, it receives precipitation all year, as snow in winter, and as thunderstorms in summer, with a dry period in late spring.

== Climbing ==
Established climbing routes on Mt. Jasper:

- East Ridge – class 3
- Northeast Ridge – class 3
- Northeast Slope – class 2
- Snow Lion – class 3
- Snow Leopard – class 3
- Gaiteraid – class 2
- Storm Gulch and South Slope – class 2

== Gallery ==
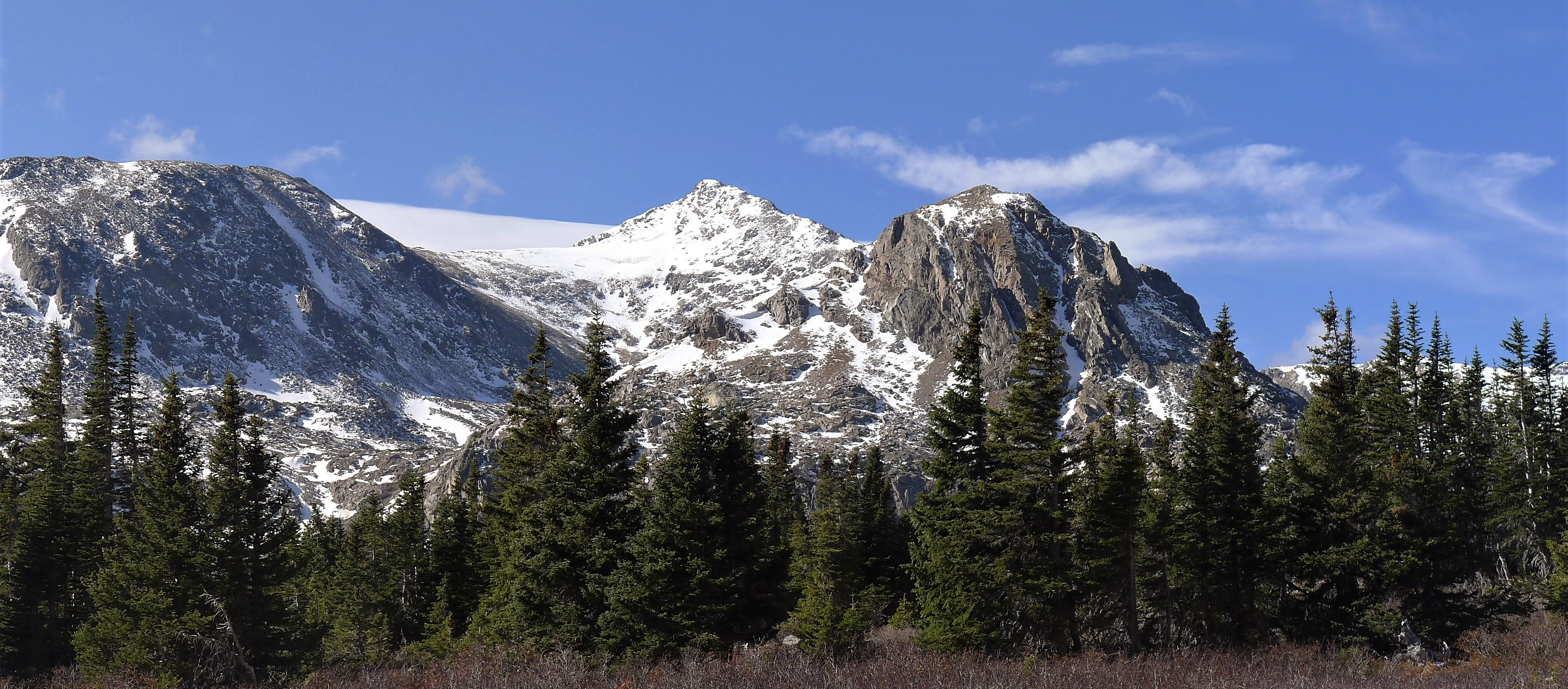
Mt. Jasper, east aspect

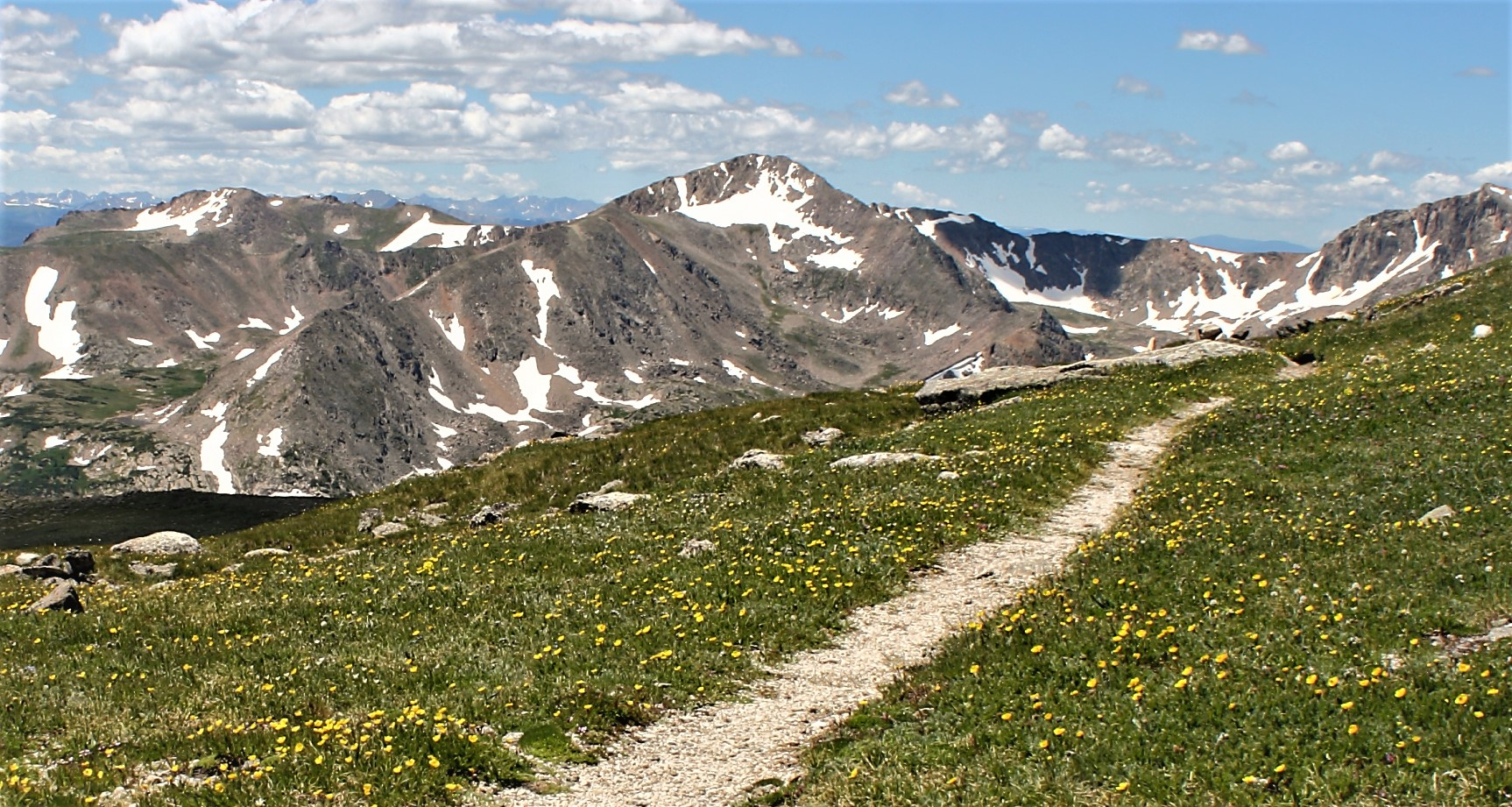
Mount Jasper viewed from Arapaho Glacier Trail

== See also ==
- Mount Neva
