= Kempster, Wisconsin =

- Unincorporated community
- Location within Wisconsin Location within the United States
- Coordinates: 45°17′23″N 89°10′00″W
- Country: United States
- State: Wisconsin
- County: Langlade
- Town: Neva
- Elevation: 1,631 ft (497 m)
- Time zone: UTC-6 (Central (CST))
  - Summer (DST): UTC-5 (CDT)
- ZIP code: 54424
- Area codes: 715 & 534
- GNIS feature ID: 1567401

Kempster is an unincorporated community located in Langlade County, Wisconsin, United States. Kempster is 10 miles (16 km) north of Antigo, in the town of Neva.

== History ==
A post office called Kempster was established in 1882, and remained in operation until it was discontinued in 2002. The community was named for Dr. Kempster, a member of staff at a psychiatric hospital.
