= Charpai =

Traditional woven bed used in South Asia

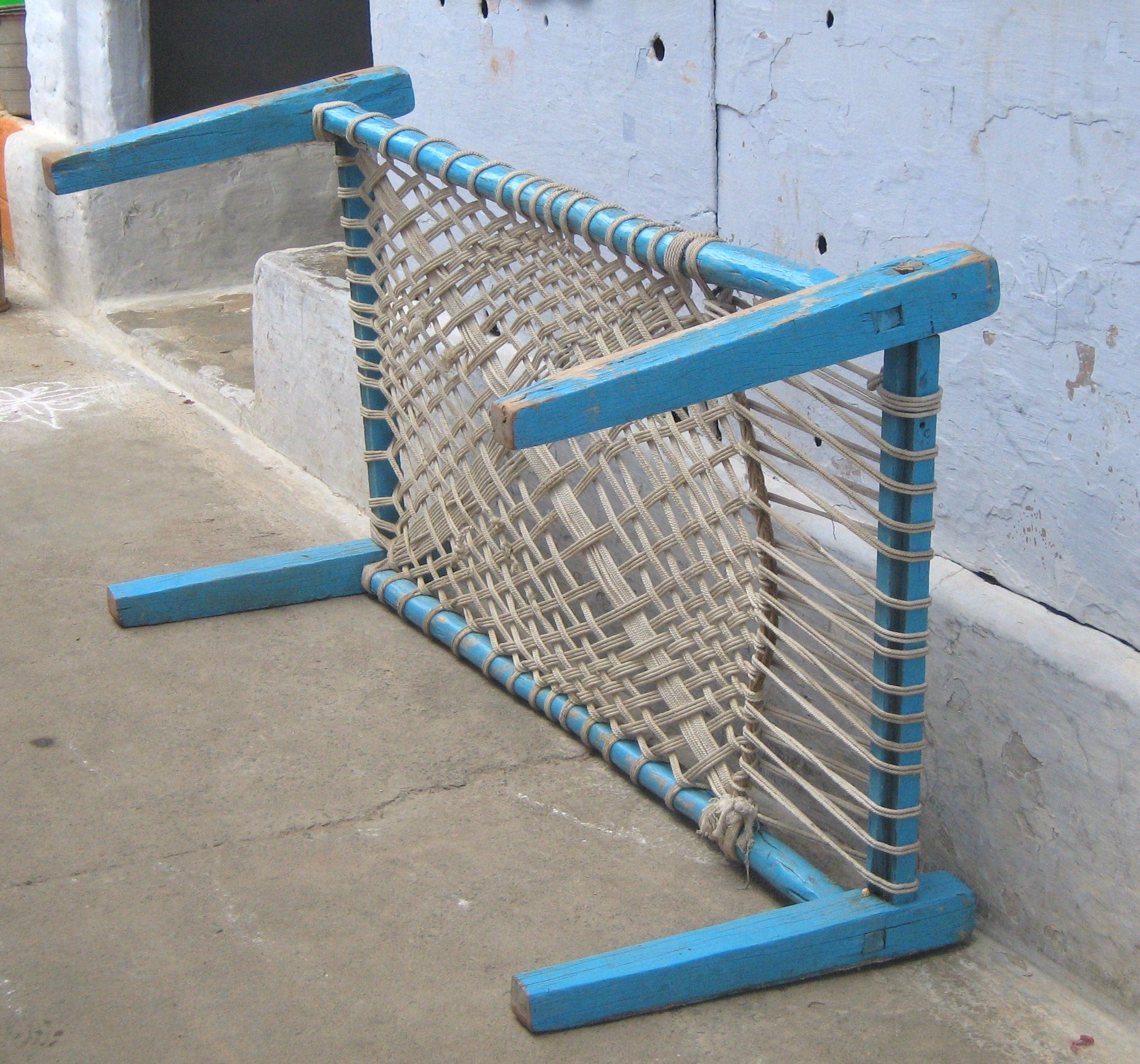
Traditional Indian charpai. At the near end, the lacing for re-tensioning the bias weave.

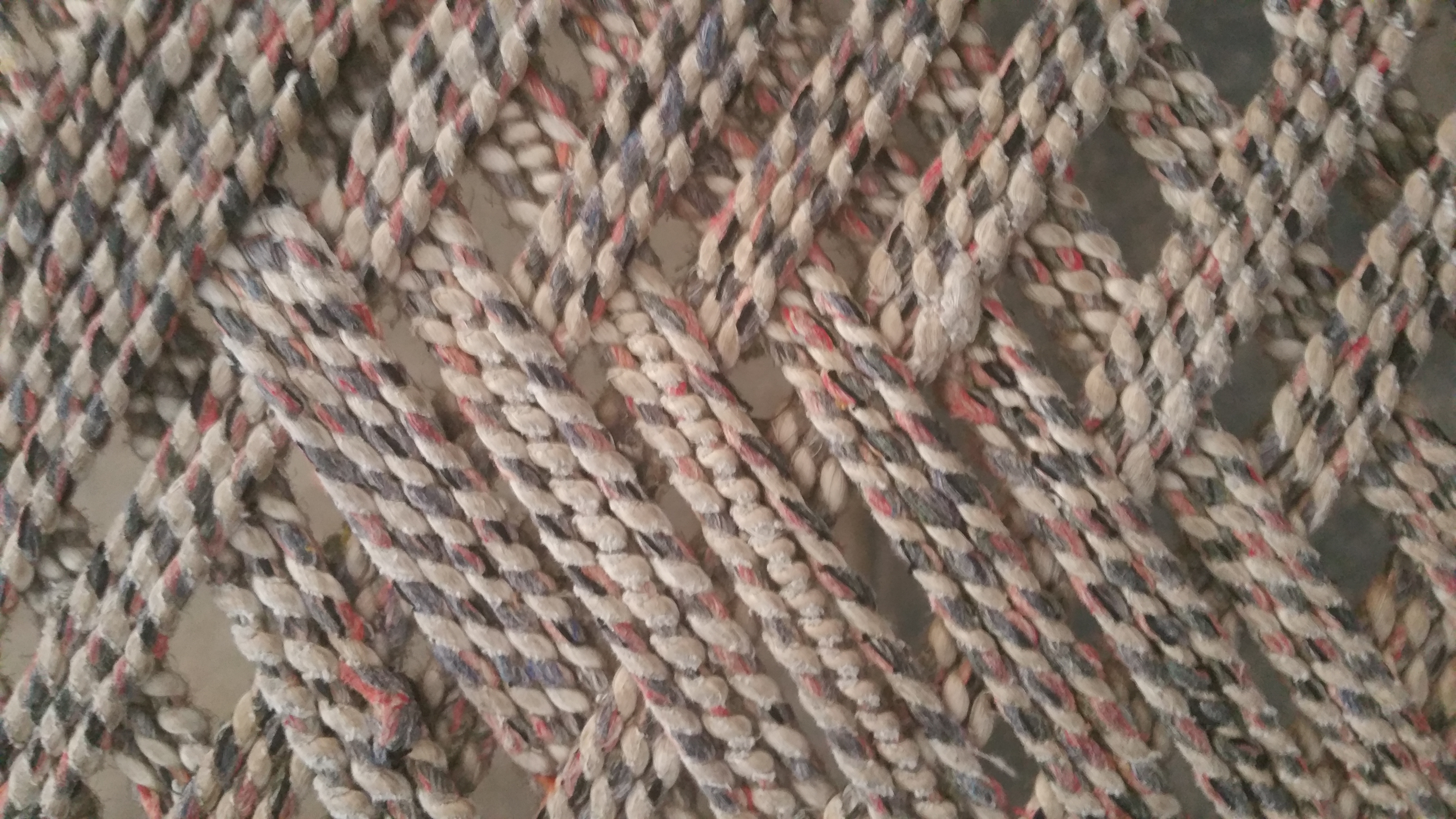
One of many charpai patterns

Charpai (also, kaithu kattil, rope cot, charpaya, charpoy, khat, khatla, manja, or manji) is a traditional woven bed used across Indian subcontinent. The name charpai is a compound of char "four" and pay "footed". Regional variations are found in Afghanistan and Pakistan, North and Central India, Bihar and Myanmar.

The charpai is a simple design that is easy to construct. It was traditionally made out of a wooden frame and natural-fiber ropes, but modern charpais may have metal frames and plastic tapes. The frame is four strong vertical posts connected by four horizontal members; the design makes the construction self-leveling. Lacing or rope can be made out of cotton, date leaves, and other natural fibers. The open and airy design of the charpai provides ventilation, making it a suitable choice for warm climates. Accordingly, it is mostly used in warm areas: in cold areas, a similar rope bed would be topped (with an insulating palliasse or tick, stuffed with straw, chaff, or down feathers), and possibly hung with curtains.

There are many interpretations of the traditional design, and over the years craftspeople have innovated with the weave patterns and materials used. The weaving is done in many ways, e.g. a diagonal cross (bias) weave, with one end woven short, and laced to the endpiece, for tensioning adjustments (which helps in controlling the sagging of the bed as it ages with use).

In the 1300s, Ibn Battuta described the charpai as having "four conical legs with four crosspieces of wood on which braids of silk or cotton are woven. When one lies down on it, there is no need for anything to make it pliable, for it is pliable of itself."

Recognized for its portability, adapted charpais were used as colonial campaign furniture.

== Construction ==
- Paaga: the legs of the charpai can be simple or mimic the legs of an animal
- Iss: the long beams of the frame, which is proportionately twice the length of the Upala
- Upala: the short beams of the frame which is kept higher than Iss
- Munj: is the webbing of rope that creates the main surface that the person sleeps on
- Badaan: is the extended area of the rope near the foot which keeps the tension

== History ==
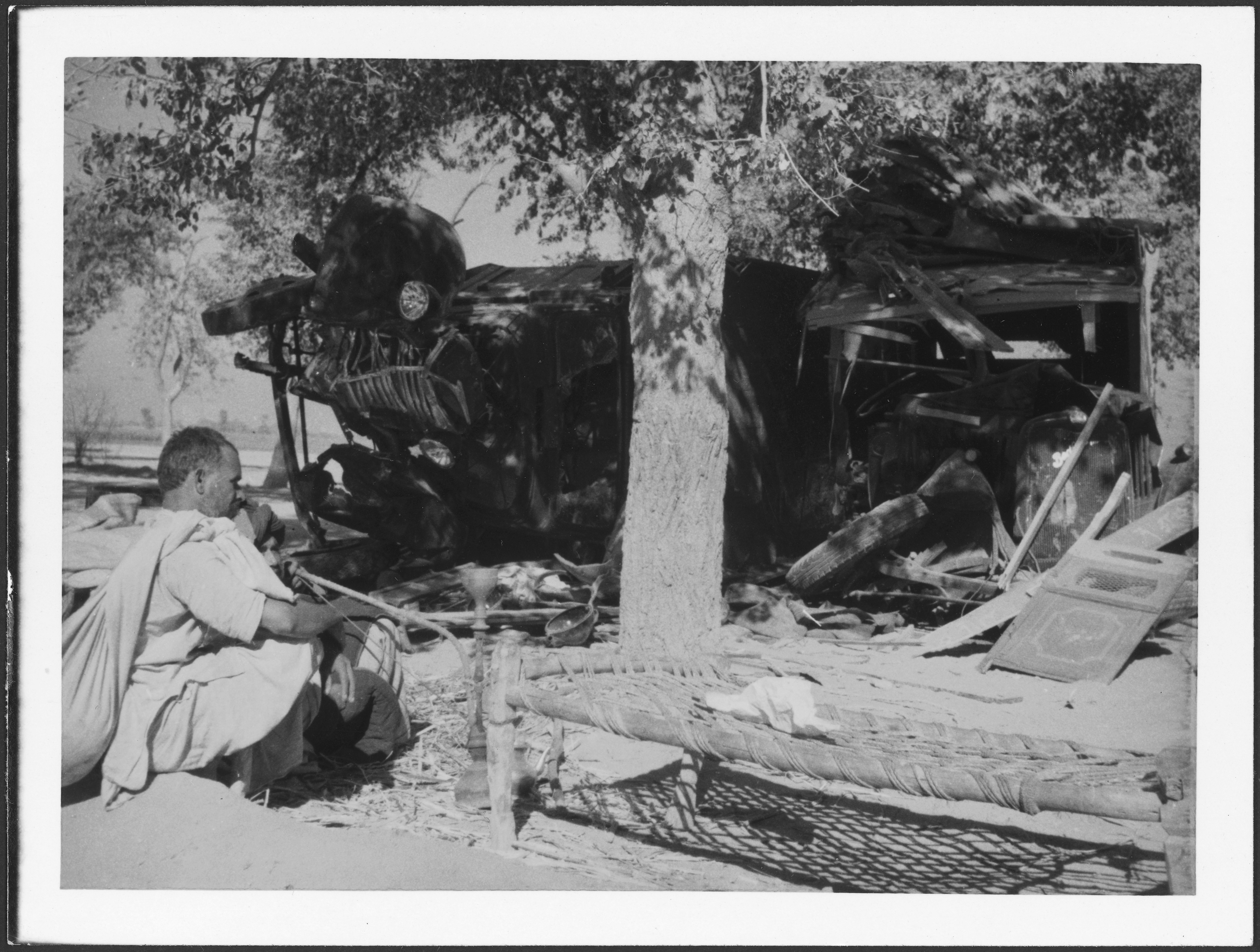
Manji bed in Amritsar, photographed by Annemarie Schwarzenbach, ca.1939–40

The exact provenance of the charpai is unknown. Various versions of it can be found in Egyptian and Mesopotamian cultures; however, the simple structured, handmade charpai is indigenous to the Indian Subcontinent. The oldest description of a charpoi in India dates back to the 2nd century BC. Bedsteads are depicted in scenes of the life of Buddha. This kind of furniture in the Buddhist time period is referred to as “Manca”. There are four known types of Mancas from ancient times: Masaranka (a longer version), Bundikabaddh (a version with slots), Kulirapadaka (a version with curved legs) and Achacca Padaka (a version with removable legs).

== Gallery ==
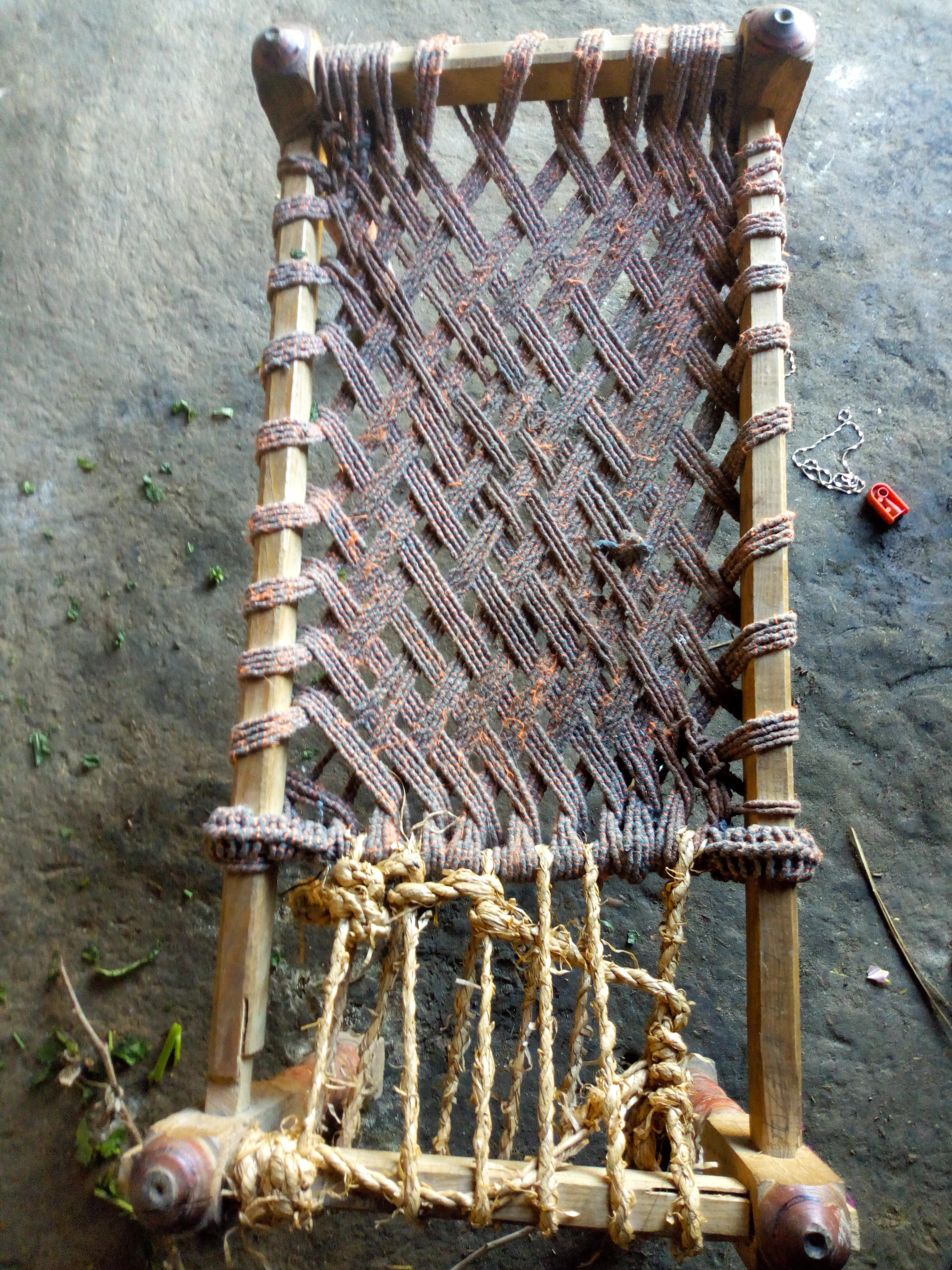
A small charpoi in Pakistan, 2019, showing structure

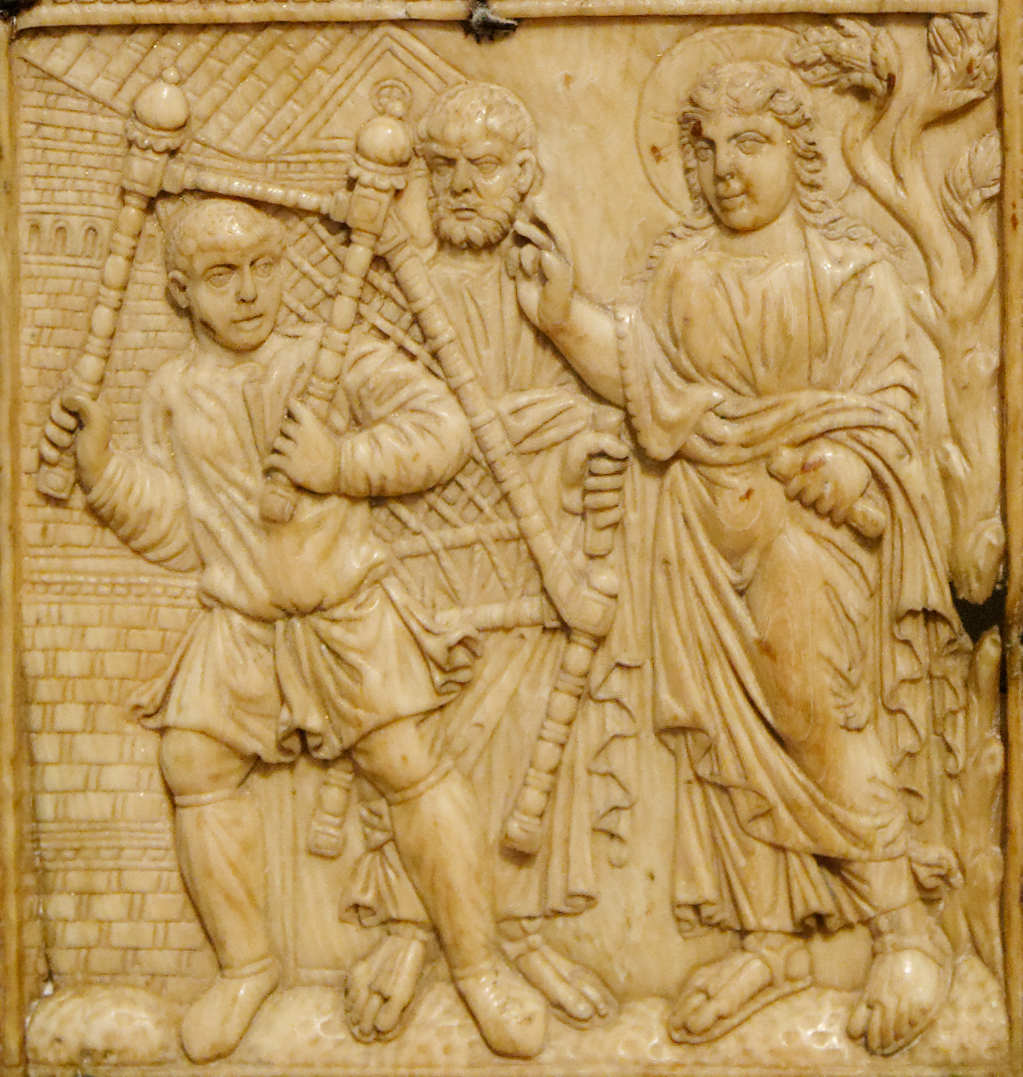
An 800s European Healing at Bethesda scene

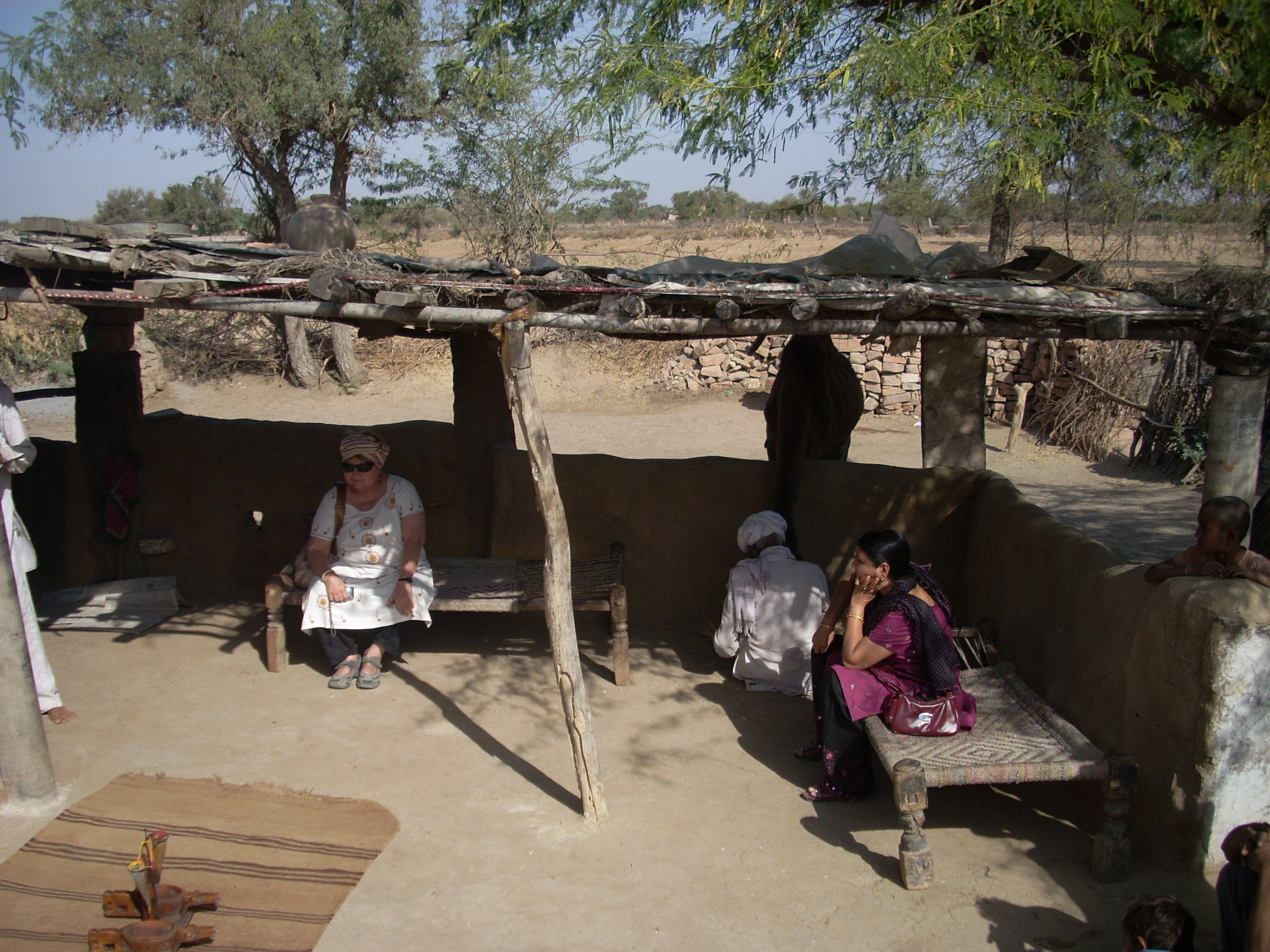
Charpais as daybeds in Rajasthan. Note diamond weave pattern.

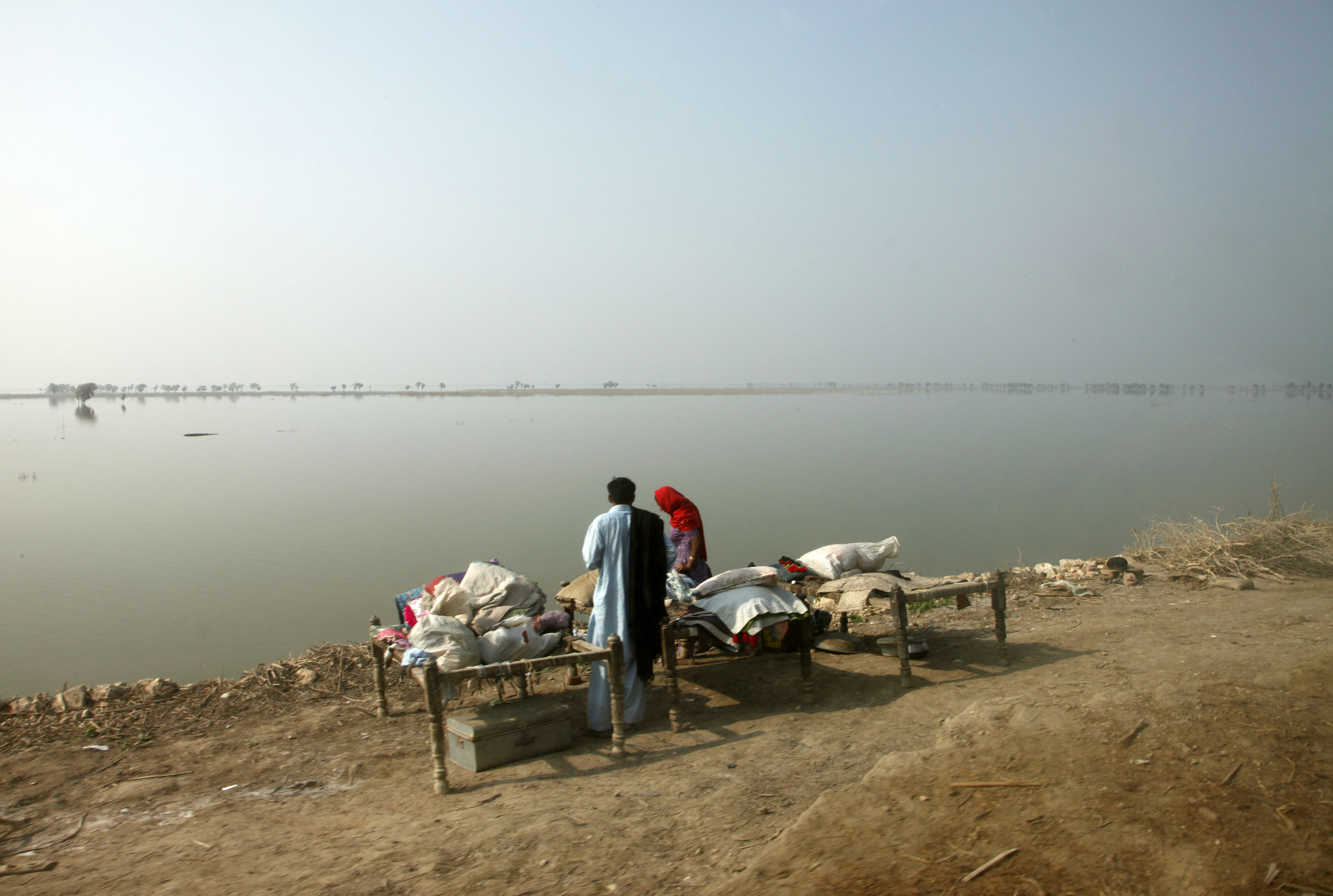
Refugees from flooding with charpai, 2010

== See also ==
- Niwar (cotton tape) used for stringing charpais
- Rope bed
- Klinē (Classical Greek)
