= Niwar (cotton tape) =

South Asian narrow, thick, woven textile

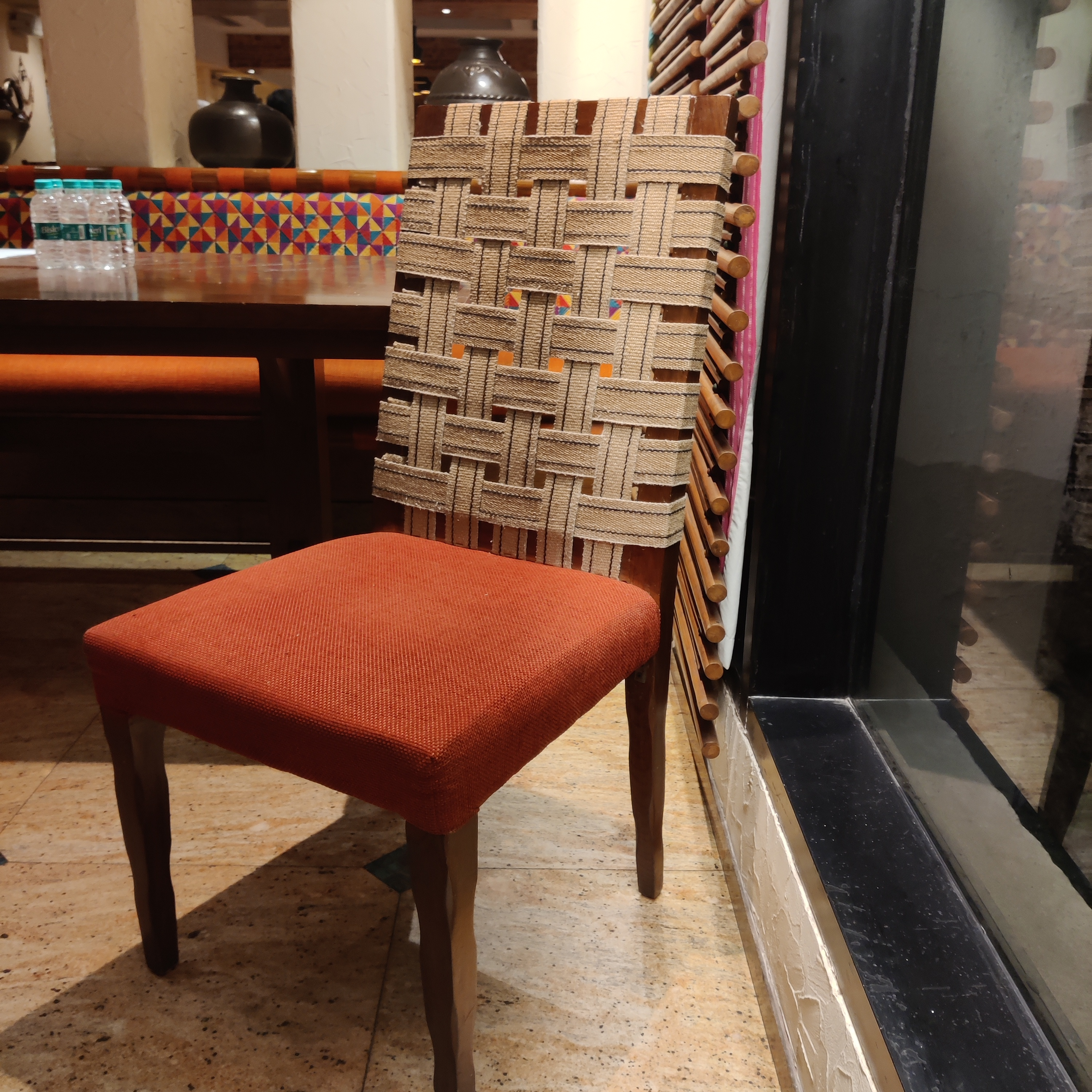
A wooden chair with a cotton niwar webbed back

Niwar (also known as newar, niwar, nivar, navār, or nuwār) is a coarse, narrow, thick tape that was initially made of cotton only. Niwar is a textile product produced on tape looms and classified as a narrow-width fabric. Baden Henry Powell referred to it as "broad coarse tape", a product of the jail industry. In his book Handbook of the Manufactures and Arts of the Punjab, Powell classified niwar under the category of "tape, string, and miscellaneous cotton products". A weaver of this tape is called a niwar-baf.

== Significance ==
In Guru Granth Sahib, the central holy text of Sikhism, the 15th-century saint Kabir lists "silks and satins and a niwar bed" as examples of luxury items. Only the rich could afford to have their beds bound with niwar, while the poor would use grass rope. Baden Henry Powell, writing in the 19th century, also mentions the high price of niwar.

Cotton niwar weaving was a source of employment for many female artisans, rural cottage industries, and work for inmates in jail industries.

== Production ==
Though Powell mentioned it in the Punjab, the manufacture of Niwar was not limited to the state of Punjab. Gazetters from various states indicate the prevalence of niwar weaving in different parts of India.

Niwar is also produced in Nasarpur, Matiari, Hala and Gambat in Sindh, and the person who makes such tapes are called Nawarbaf.

=== Small-scale and rural cottage industry ===
Towards the close of the 17th century, rural weavers in various regions of India produced an extensive assortment of cotton products, encompassing coverlets, rugs, ropes, bed tapes such as niwar, packing carpets, and furnishings, among others. The findings of a study titled "Durrie Weaving as Income Generation" showed that women in rural regions wove articles for survival, including "aasan," "foot mats," "bags," and "niwar," in addition to durries.

Niwar was a widely used type of hand-spun fabric produced in rural communities during the 20th century. Both plain and dyed varieties of niwar were produced and sold in urban centers. It made use of coarser yarns, providing support to hand-spun yarn manufacturers.According to the 20th century "Cottage and Small-Scale Industries" report, cotton was a crucial resource in daily life, used for everything from clothing to other types of coverings. It was a fiber that could be used in all seasons, even winter, and was used to stuff beds and quilts. Coarse yarn was utilized to weave niwar, carpets, and durries, both at home and in small-scale and rural cottage industries.

According to Uttar Pradesh district gazetteers, there were 53 units making niwar in Mathura until 1950. In 1956, 215 cottage industries in Bareilly employed 400 individuals and invested Rs 48,400. The industry was primarily conducted by women artisans in their homes. 780 maunds of yarn valued at Rs 85,000 were consumed, and 760 maunds of niwar valued at Rs 110,600 were produced. Sales of niwar reached Rs 93,500 in the local market. Additionally, prisoners at the Bareilly Central Jail were utilized in various enterprises, including spinning, weaving, tailoring, and the production of durries, carpets, niwar, hemp and ban twisting and weaving.

Gazetteers for Rajasthan and Jodhpur also mention niwar's production in the late 20th century. The region was well-known for its traditional industries, among which were tie-and-dye saris. The textiles sector includes cloth, tents, niwar, ropes, namda, and ready-to-wear clothes.

As per Haryana state gazetteers, in 1990, the town of Sonipat was engaged in the weaving of niwar and tape.

Adequate market access shortage hampered the enthusiasm of artisans who needed support in product design, understanding consumer preference, and staying updated with current product styles. Despite global recognition of some handloom products like Indian durries, the financial well-being of artisans and craftspeople didn't improve. Over time, niwar weaving grew and adapted to industrial developments.

== Applications ==
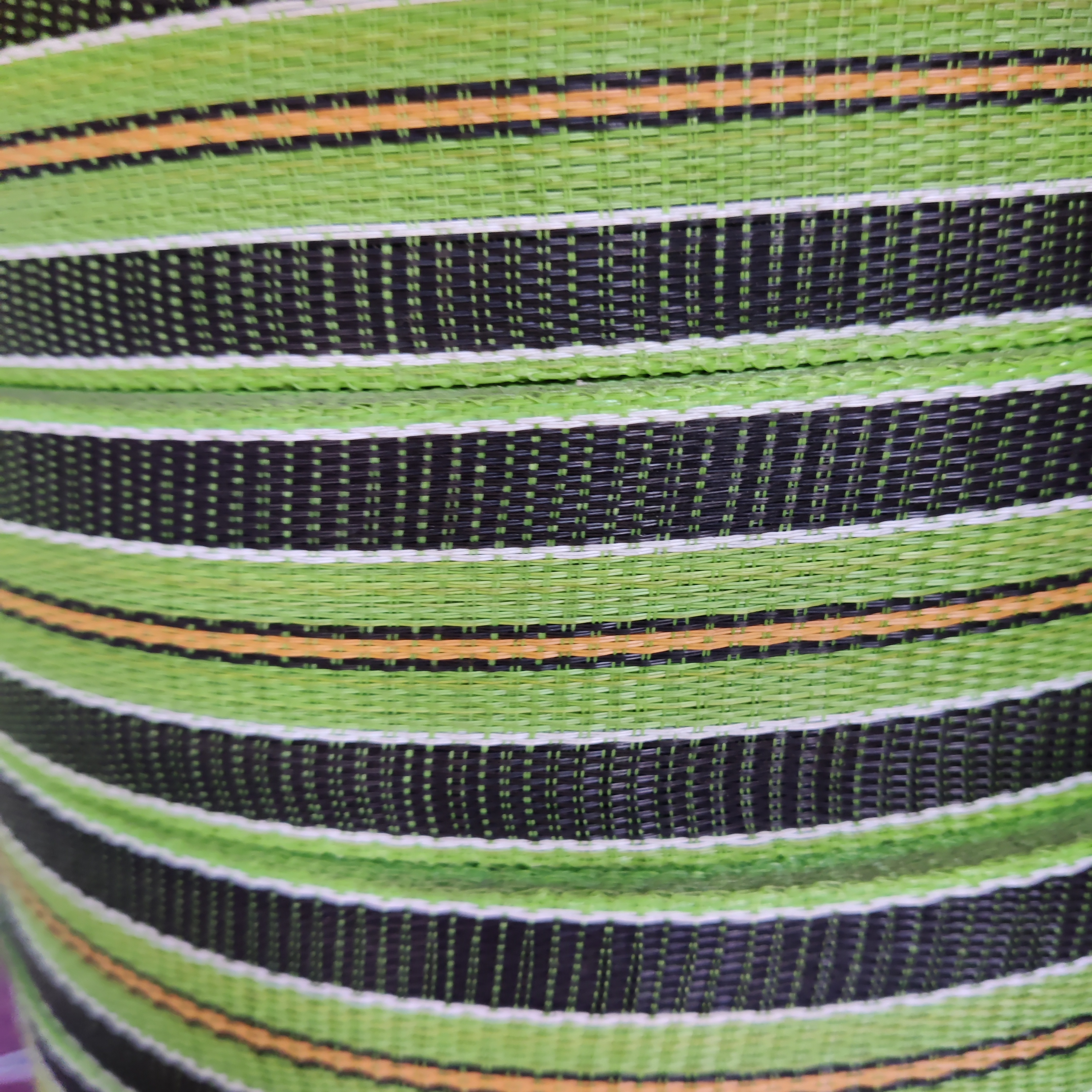
Niwar

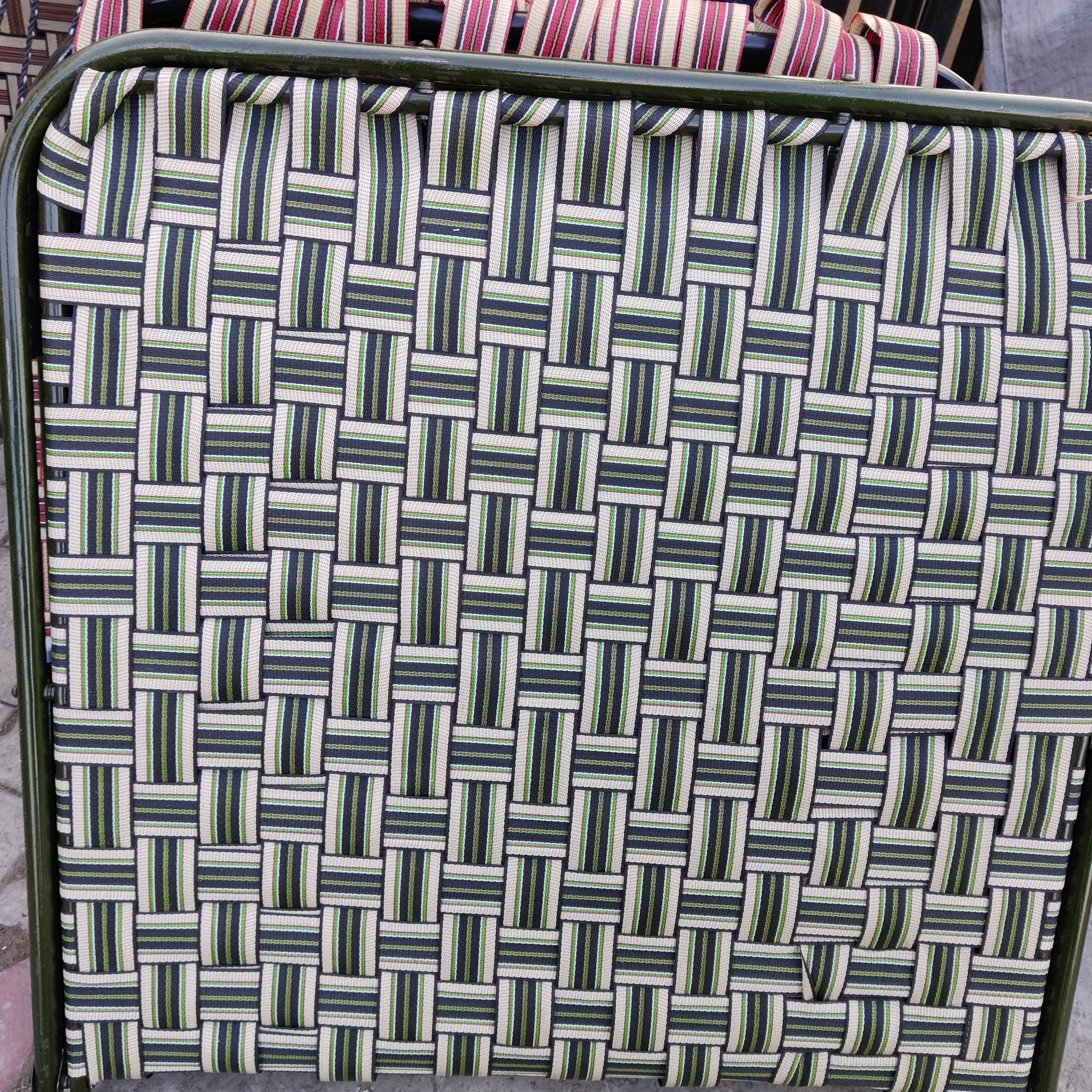
Niwar-webbed folding bed

Niwar is a highly versatile material that can be used in a variety of applications due to its adaptability. It can be utilized for various purposes, ranging from household and decorative items to industrial and commercial applications. These are summarized as follows:

=== Furniture material and in tents ===
Niwar is a bed base material for bed frame webbing. It is a kind of coarse cotton tape used to form the web of a charpai (a kind of rope bed) and stools also called "pirhi" or "Peedi" in Punjabi language.

Niwar helps in sewing canvas or cloth tents. During the Mughal Period, military camps and tents were constructed utilizing ropes, and cotton niwar, and cotton niwar was used for bedsteads during the princely reign.

=== Belts ===
Niwar was also used in the production of belts and employed to carry the zinc water bottle, commonly referred to as "badla." Niwar is also used in school belts.

=== Miscellaneous ===
Niwar products were used as a part of vocational training for skill development and entrepreneurship development. The prisoners in Udaipur jail were trained to produce a wide range of products, including bags, belts, mats (asans), and magazine holders.

Niwar was utilized in the care of cattle, serving as a component in the application of bandages and cotton padding, with the aim of mitigating further harm to bones and soft tissues.

Niwar has its applications in military use. The Central Reserve Police Force has deemed niwar, with specific specifications of 65mm width, grey undyed shade, and conforming to the IS: 1995-1982 standard, as suitable for use. The Indian army frequently includes niwar in their tenders as a necessary item, along with other sports equipment and materials such as jute rope, footballs, volleyballs, table tennis balls, nets, cricket equipment, and reflector tape.

=== Present ===
Indian government institutions provide educational programs in the arts of weaving, including hand weaving of niwar tape, durries, and carpets, as well as weaving of silk and woolen fabrics. Additionally, they offer courses in the techniques of bleaching, dyeing, and calico printing.

In the 21st century niwar is produced by machines and is made from both cotton and synthetic materials such as polyester and nylon. Due to its durability and versatility, this material finds extensive application in the manufacturing of furniture such as beds with frames made of either wood or metal, as well as folding beds. It is also utilized in the binding of the edges of floor coverings such as durries, and in the fabrication of sporting goods like nets. It is commonly used in the creation of hanging materials and displays in exhibitions.

=== Trade ===
India is the world's biggest exporter of cotton niwar, exporting the majority of niwar to the United States, United Arab Emirates, and Nepal. Currently, niwar is also being made from materials such as nylon, polypropylene, and polyester. Nylon niwar, in particular, is known for its strength and ability to withstand various weather conditions.

Niwar is a Harmonized System coded commodity. Cotton niwar narrow-woven fabrics are assigned HS Code 58063120.

== See also ==
- Charpai
