= Deerbrook, Wisconsin =

- Unincorporated community
- Location within Wisconsin Location within the United States
- Coordinates: 45°14′01″N 89°09′20″W
- Country: United States
- State: Wisconsin
- County: Langlade
- Town: Neva
- Elevation: 1,529 ft (466 m)
- Time zone: UTC-6 (Central (CST))
  - Summer (DST): UTC-5 (CDT)
- ZIP code: 54424
- Area codes: 715 & 534
- GNIS feature ID: 1563862

Deerbrook is an unincorporated community in Langlade County, Wisconsin, United States. Deerbrook is on County Highway E, north of Antigo in the town of Neva. It has a post office that has been operating since 1887 with ZIP code 54424.

== Etymology ==
Deerbrook was named by Edward Dawson, a timber cruiser and prospector, who saw a deer drink from a nearby brook, and called the area "Deerbrook".
