= Newar (disambiguation) =

The Newar people are an ethnic group of the Kathmandu Valley in Nepal.

Newar may also refer to:

- Newar language, their Sino-Tibetan language
  - Nepalese scripts, various scripts used to write the language
  - Newar script or Newa, a particular script formerly used for Newari
- Newar literature
- Newar caste system
- Newar art
- Newar architecture
- Newar cuisine
- Newar dance
- Newar traditional clothing

== See also ==
- Niwar (disambiguation)
- Neva (disambiguation)
- Newaric languages, a Sino-Tibetan language group of Nepal
