= Rope bed =

Type of platform bed

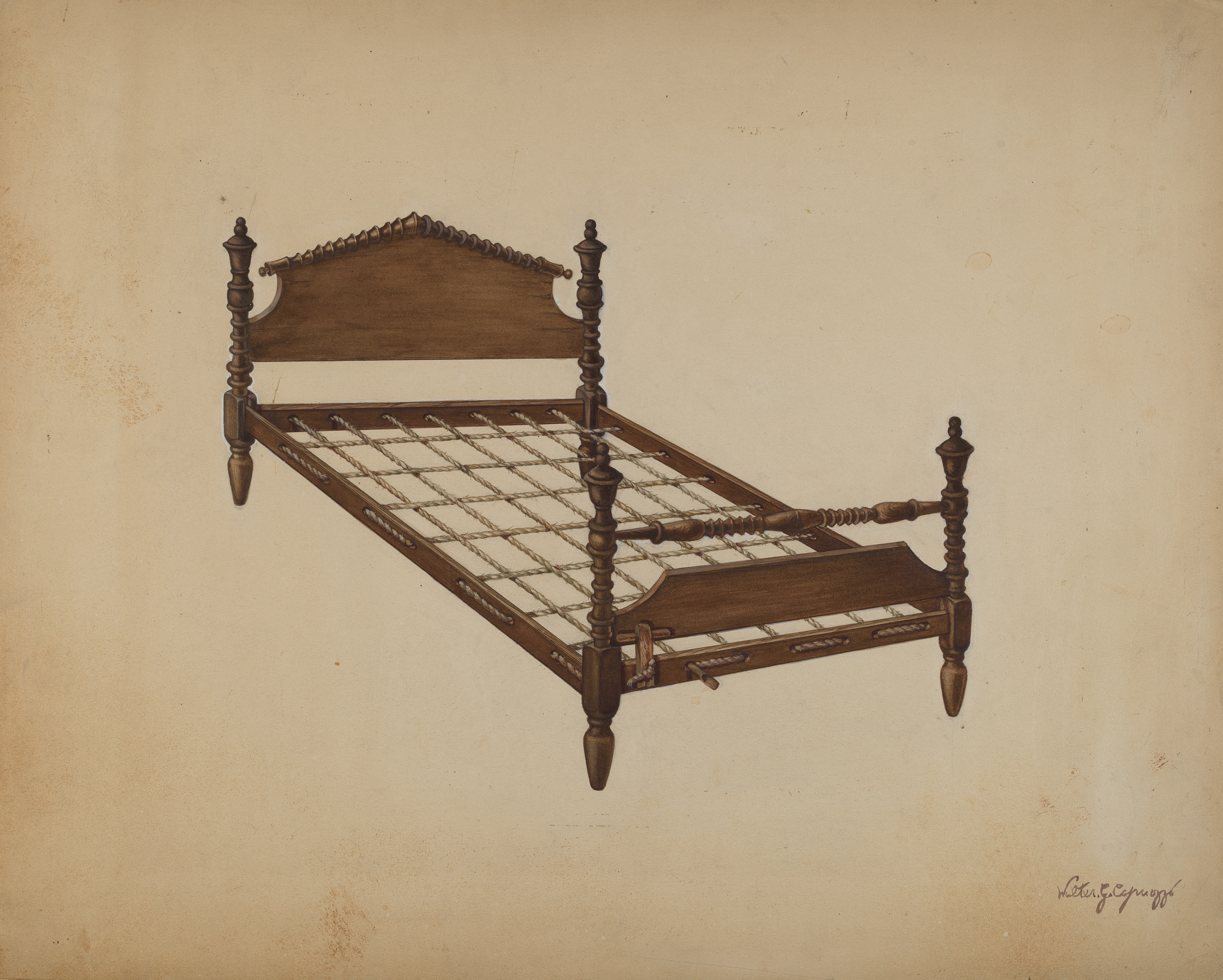
A rope bed without its mattresses etc.

A rope bed is a type of platform bed in which the sleeper (and mattress) is supported by a lattice of rope, rather than wooden slats.

In cold climates, a rope bed would be topped with one or more insulating paillasses or bedticks, which would traditionally be stuffed with straw, chaff, or down feathers. It might also have a canopy hung with warm curtains. Modernly, they may be topped by a thin futon (a form of bedtick) or other roll-up mattress (see mattress topper).

In the sixteenth century (England?), bedmats of woven or plaited rush were often laid on the widely-spaced ropes, and the bedticks were laid on the mats. This stopped them from bulging between the ropes.

Rope beds need to be tightened regularly (with a bed wrench, and sometimes with wedges) as they sag. They must also be re-strung occasionally; re-stringing reduces sag and evens out wear. When fully or partly unstrung, rope beds can be packed flat for transport. The need to tighten bedcords has been said to be the origin of the English phrase "sleep tight", but some etymologists disagree.

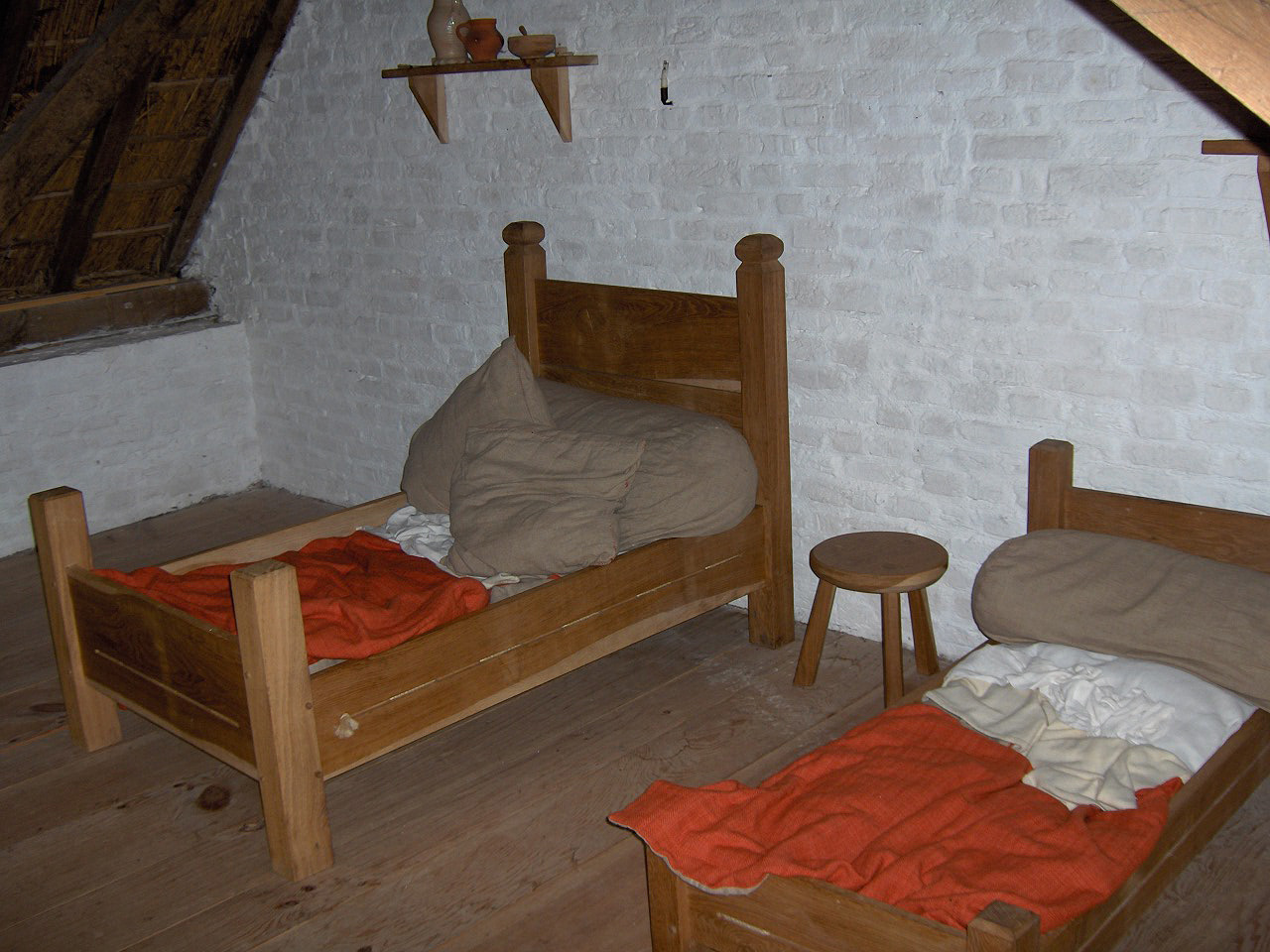
Medieval-reconstruction rope beds (circa 1465); note loops of rope protruding from side boards

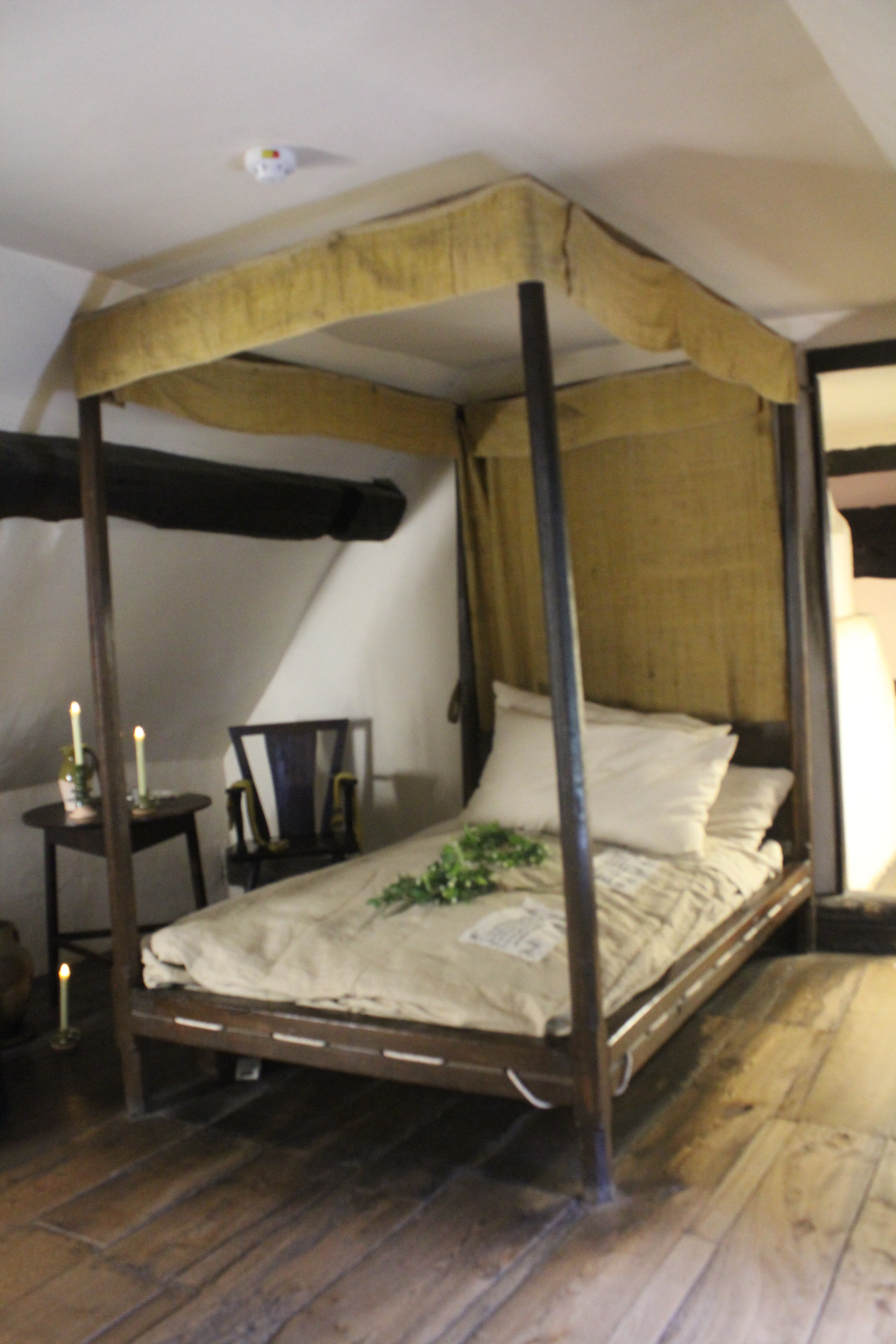
A rope bedframe thought to have belonged to William Shakespeare

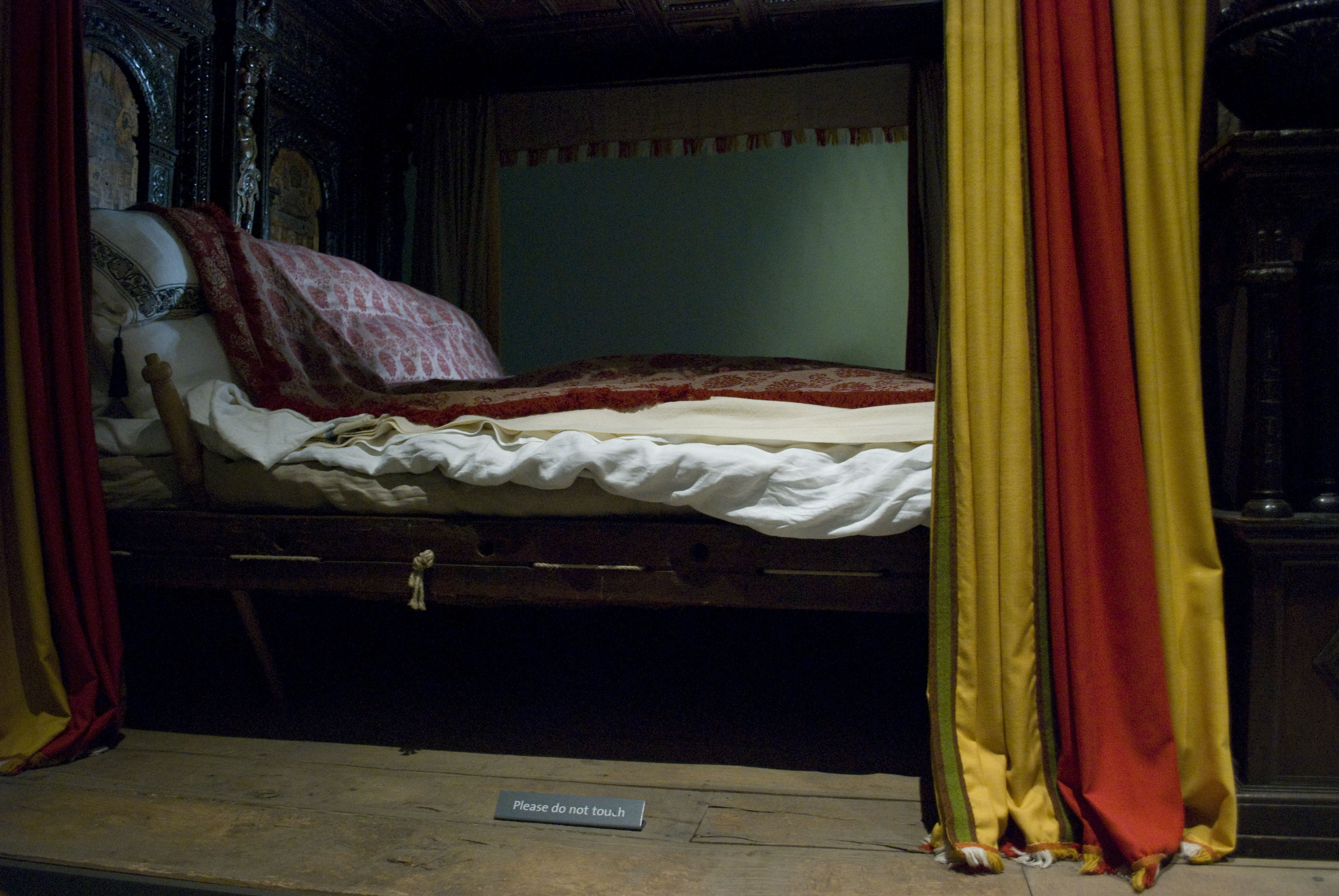
Bedclothes pulled back to show the bedcords of the 1590s Great Bed of Ware

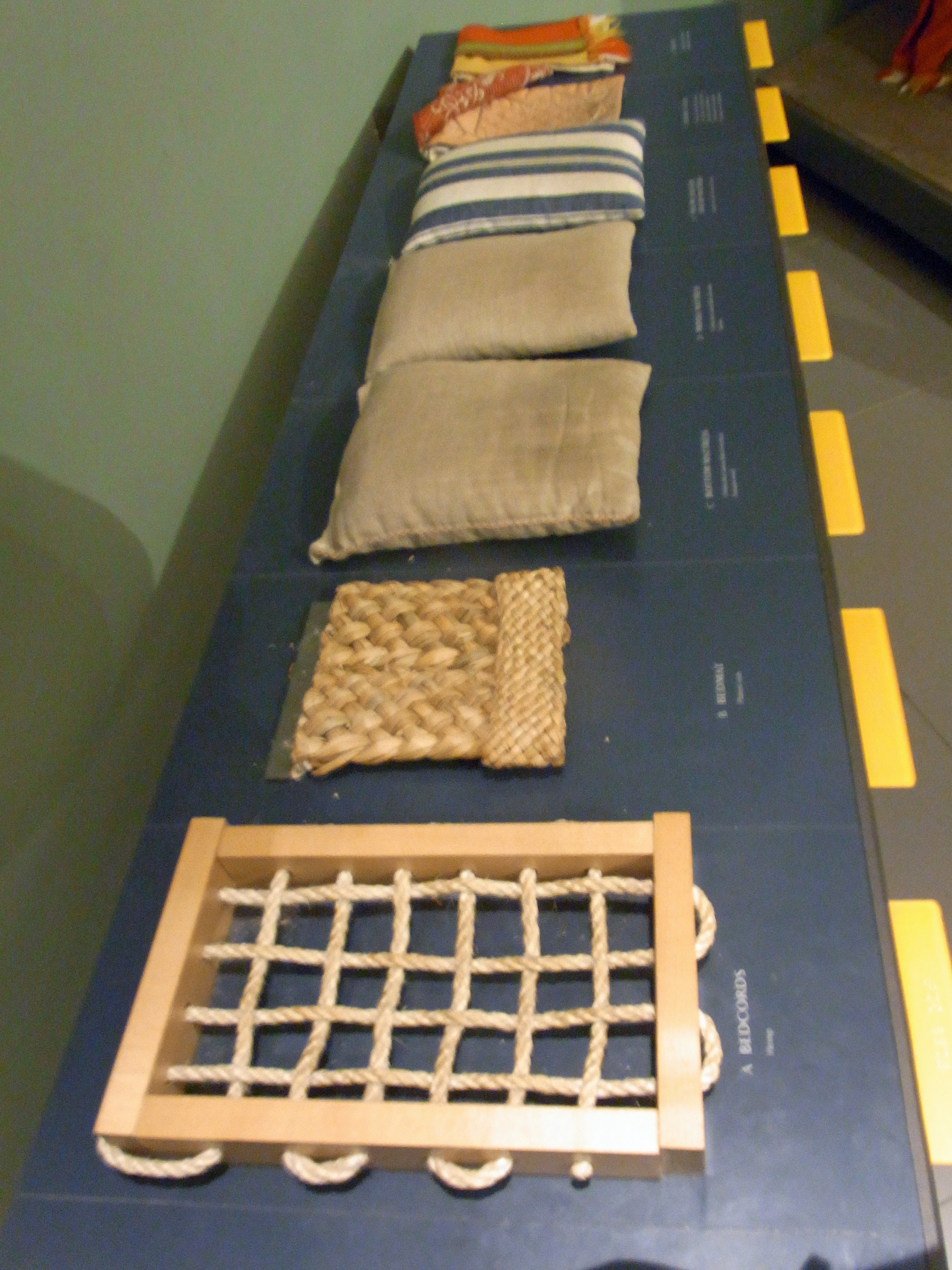
Touchable museum samples illustrating the layers of the Great Bed of Ware: the bedcords, a plaited-rush bedmat, a flockbed and then a featherbed in dun ticking, a downbed in striped ticking, and the bedlinen. Flock is unspun fibers, in this case probably wool. The bedticks stuffed with the softest fillings are laid topmost.

== See also ==
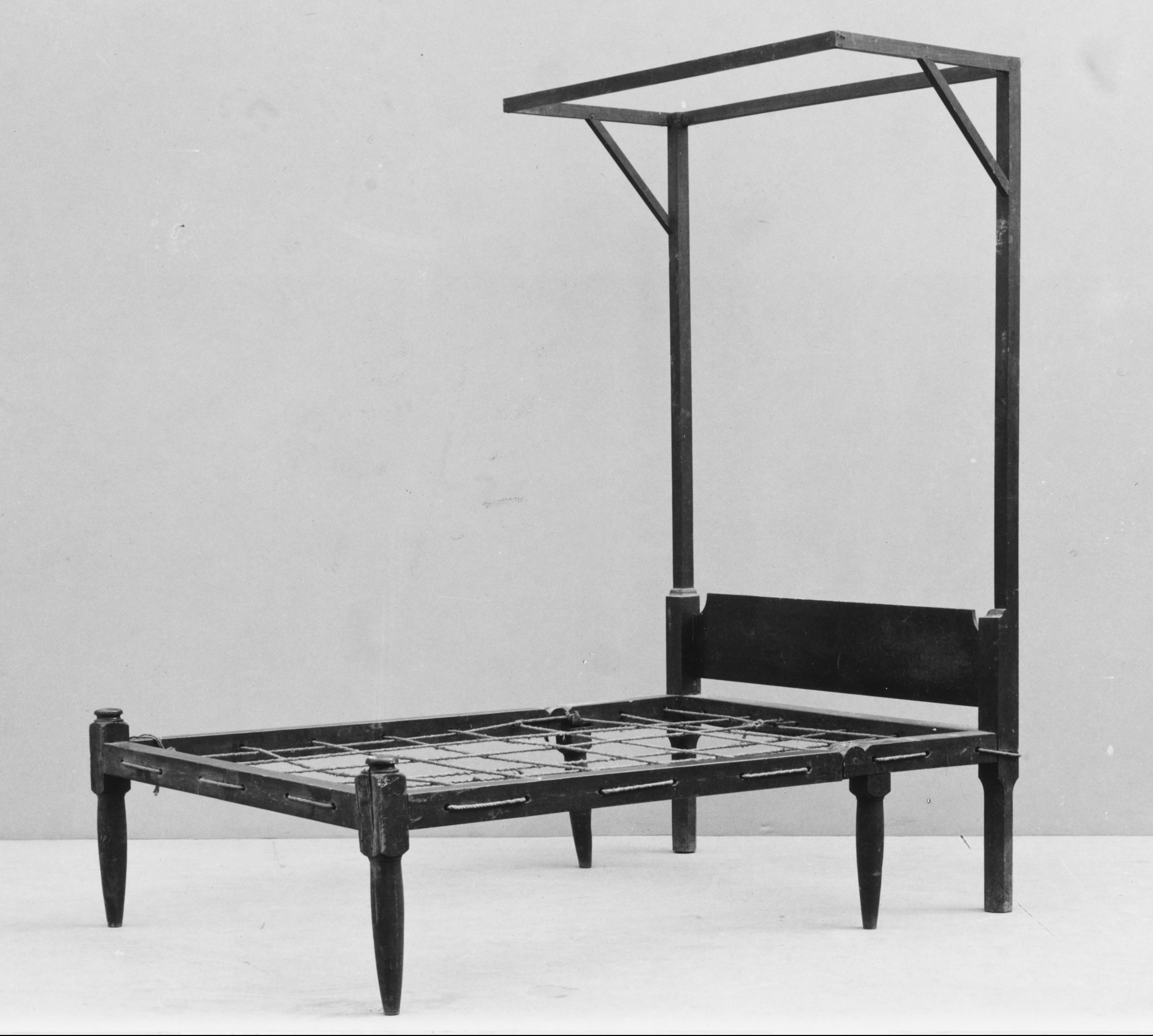
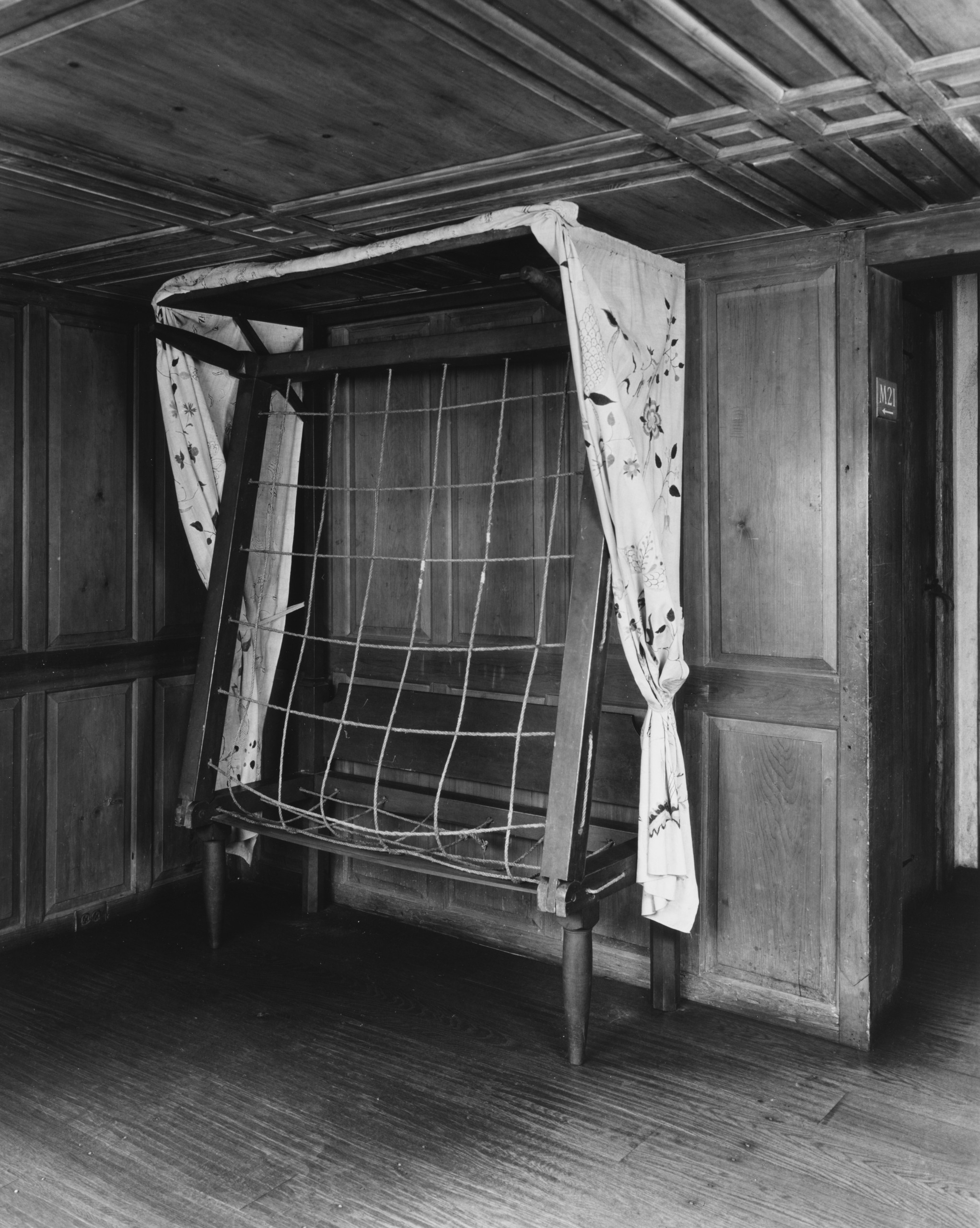
A rope-base murphy-bed, 1740–90, United States. In use, the upper frame would suspend a canopy and curtains, which would hide the bed entirely when it was folded and make it a lit à demi-ciel when unfolded
- Charpai (warm-climate version)
- Bedtick
- Platform bed
- Murphy bed; some are rope (or wire) beds

Media related to Rope bedframes at Wikimedia Commons
