= Neva, Wisconsin =

- Town
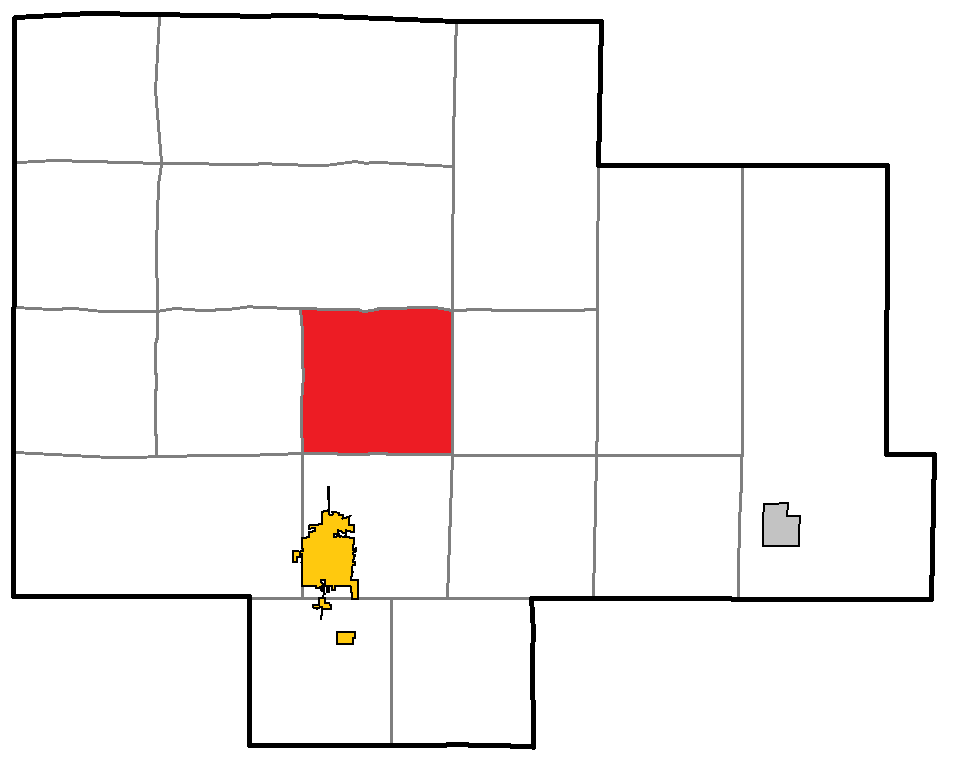
- Location of Neva, within Langlade County
- Coordinates: 45°14′55″N 89°7′27″W
- Country: United States
- State: Wisconsin
- County: Langlade

Area
  - Total: 37.75 sq mi (97.78 km^{2})
  - Land: 37.30 sq mi (96.60 km^{2})
  - Water: 0.46 sq mi (1.18 km^{2})
- Elevation: 1,555 ft (474 m)

Population (2020)
  - Total: 846
  - Density: 22.7/sq mi (8.76/km^{2})
- Time zone: UTC-6 (Central (CST))
  - Summer (DST): UTC-5 (CDT)
- ZIP Codes: 54424 (Deerbrook); 54418 (Bryant)
- Area codes: 715 & 534
- FIPS code: 55-067-56200
- GNIS feature ID: 1583796
- Website: https://townofnevawi.gov/

Neva is a town in Langlade County, Wisconsin, United States. The population was 846 at the 2020 census, down from 902 at the 2010 census. The town established a post office in 1892, until it was discontinued in 1898.

The unincorporated communities of Deerbrook, Kempster, Neva, and Neva Corners are located in the town.

== Geography ==
Neva is in central Langlade County, directly north of Antigo, the county seat. According to the United States Census Bureau, the town has a total area of 37.8 square miles (97.8 km^{2}), of which 37.3 square miles (96.6 km^{2}) are land and 0.46 square miles (1.2 km^{2}), or 1.21%, are water. The town is mainly drained by the East Branch of the Eau Claire River, which flows from northeast to southwest across the town. The northern part of the town is hilly with numerous lakes, including the Neva Lakes and Anderson Lake.

== Demographics ==
As of the census of 2000, there were 994 people, 360 households, and 290 families residing in the town. The population density was 26.6 people per square mile (10.3/km^{2}). There were 385 housing units at an average density of 10.3 per square mile (4/km^{2}). The racial makeup of the town was 98.99% White, 0.1% African American, 0.1% from other races, and 0.8% from two or more races. Hispanic or Latino people of any race were 1.11% of the population.

There were 360 households, out of which 37.5% had children under the age of 18 living with them, 72.8% were married couples living together, 5.3% had a female householder with no husband present, and 19.4% were non-families. 16.7% of all households were made up of individuals, and 6.9% had someone living alone who was 65 years of age or older. The average household size was 2.76 and the average family size was 3.12.

In the town, the population was spread out, with 28% under the age of 18, 4.7% from 18 to 24, 28.6% from 25 to 44, 24.2% from 45 to 64, and 14.5% who were 65 years of age or older. The median age was 39 years. For every 100 females, there were 105.4 males. For every 100 females age 18 and over, there were 105.7 males.

The median income for a household in the town was $40,368, and the median income for a family was $43,229. Males had a median income of $29,773 versus $20,893 for females. The per capita income for the town was $16,503. About 5.2% of families and 5.4% of the population were below the poverty line, including 7.3% of those under age 18 and 4.1% of those age 65 or over.
