= Mount Neva (Nevada) =

Mountain in the U.S. state of Nevada

- Location within Nevada

Highest point
- Elevation: 8,570 ft (2,610 m)
- Coordinates: 41°20′05″N 116°21′31″W

Geography
- Location: Elko County
- Country: United States
- State: Nevada
- County: Elko County

Mount Neva is a summit in Elko County, Nevada, in the United States. With an elevation of 8,570 feet (2,610 m), Mount Neva is the 381st highest summit in the state of Nevada.
