= Mount Neva (Colorado) =

Mountain in Colorado, United States

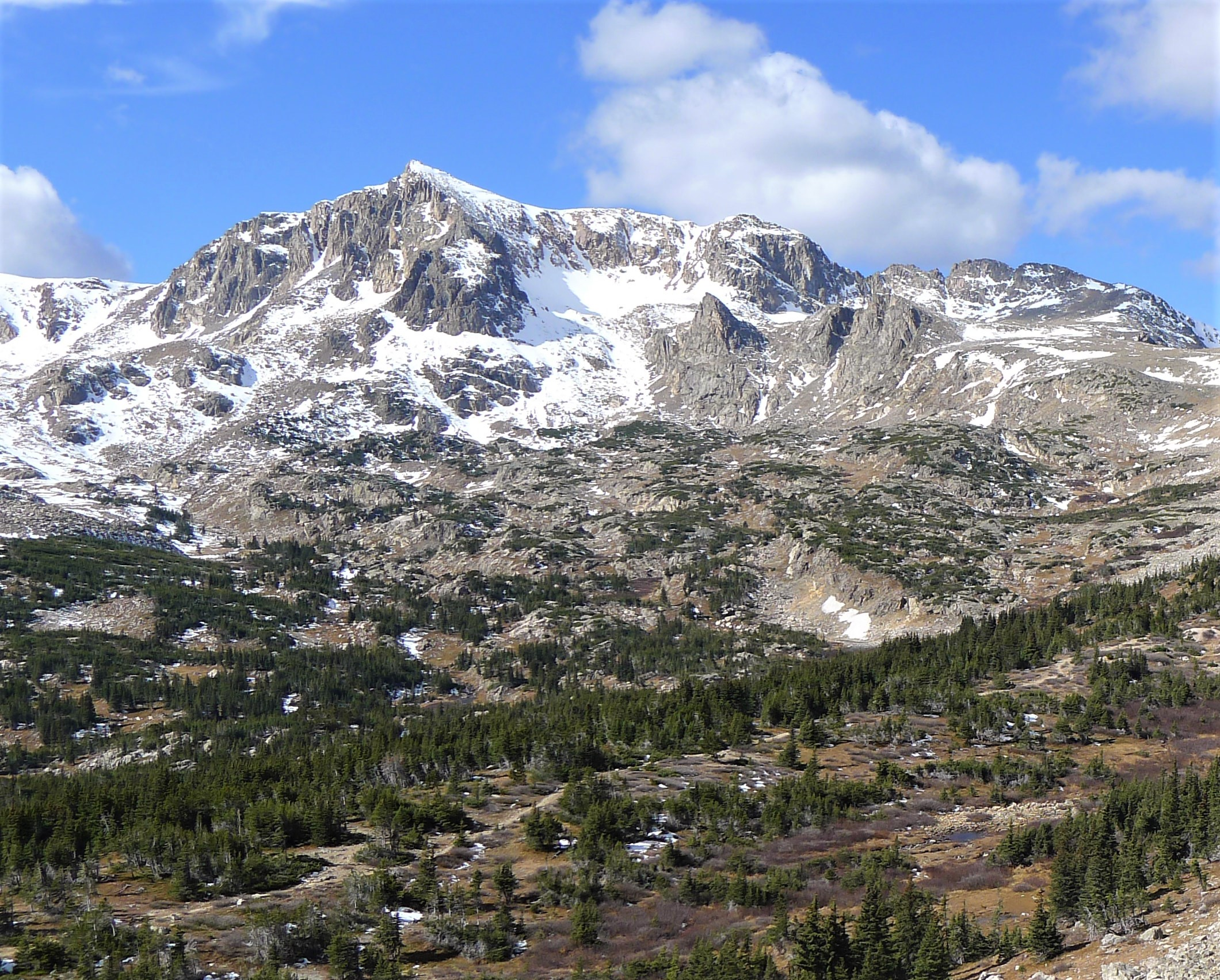
- East aspect

Highest point
- Elevation: 12,849 ft (3,916 m)
- Prominence: 506 ft (154 m)
- Parent peak: Mount Jasper (12,923 ft)
- Isolation: 0.88 mi (1.42 km)
- Coordinates: 40°00′25″N 105°41′18″W

Geography
- Location within Colorado Location within the United States
- Country: United States
- State: Colorado
- County: Boulder County / Grand County
- Protected area: Indian Peaks Wilderness
- Parent range: Rocky Mountains; Front Range
- Topo map: USGS Monarch Lake

Climbing
- Easiest route: Hiking class 2

Mount Neva is a summit in Grand County, Colorado, in the United States. With an elevation of 12,849 feet (3,916 m), Mount Neva is the 752nd-highest summit in the state of Colorado.

Mount Neva was named for Chief Niwot's brother.

== Hiking ==
Mount Neva can be reached from the Fourth of July trailhead west of Nederland, Colorado. The trail is generally rather easy until it reaches Mount Neva's north ridge. Starting at this point, one follows the north ridge to the summit, but this requires long and sustained stretches of class 4 scrambling and climbing on terrain with very substantial vertical exposure.

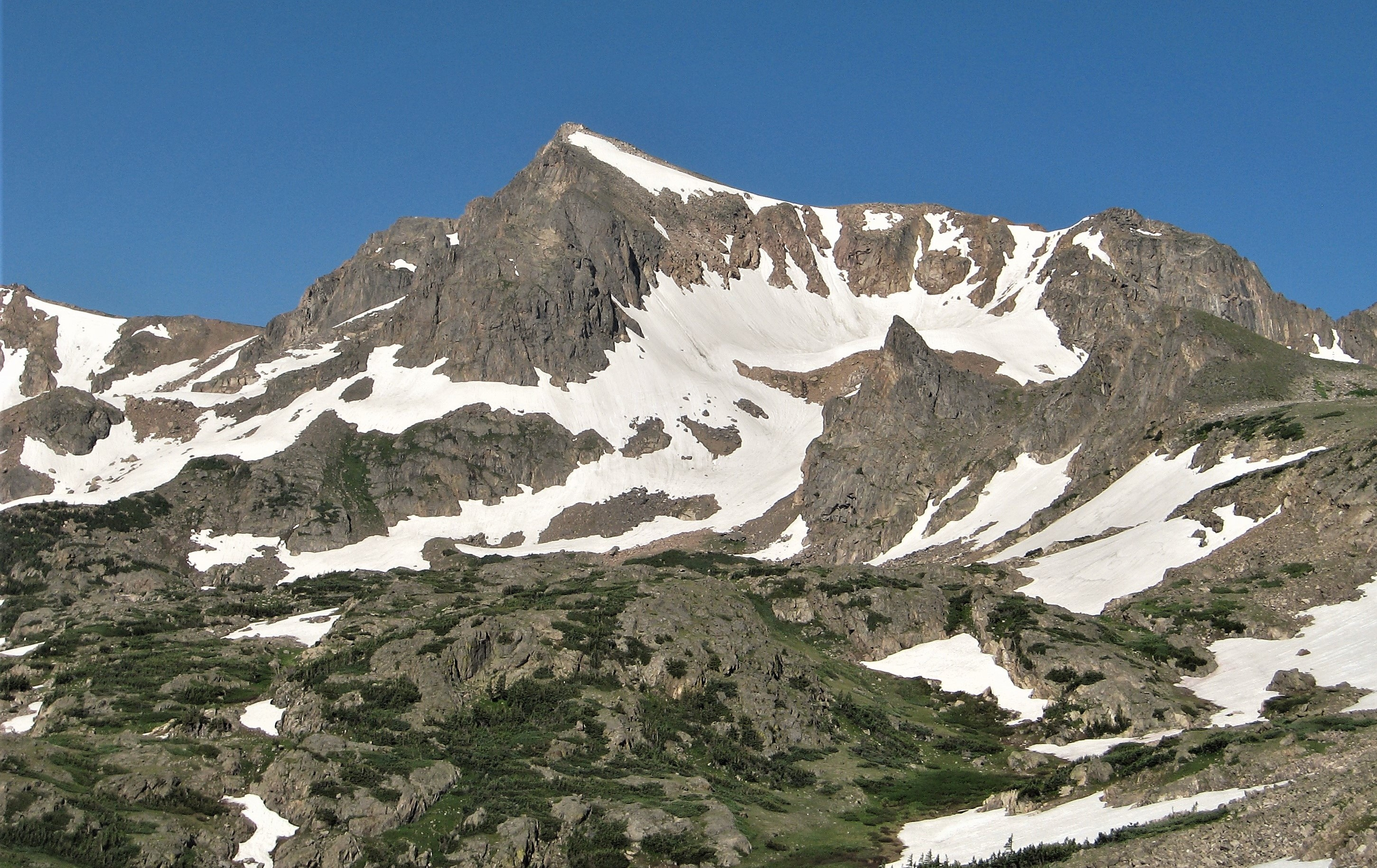
Mt. Neva

== Climate ==
According to the Köppen climate classification system, the mountain is located in an alpine subarctic climate zone with cold, snowy winters, and cool to warm summers. Due to its altitude, it receives precipitation all year, as snow in winter, and as thunderstorms in summer, with a dry period in late spring.
