= Niwari, Uttar Pradesh =

- Town
- Location in Uttar Pradesh, India Niwari, Uttar Pradesh (India)
- Coordinates: 28.88°N 77.53°E
- Country: India
- State: Uttar Pradesh
- District: Ghaziabad

Government
  - Type: local
  - Body: chairman
  - MLA: Dr. Manju Shivach
  - Chairman of GPP: Mr.Anil Tyagi
- Elevation: 215 m (705 ft)

Population (2001)
  - Total: 9,919

Languages
  - Official: Hindi
- Time zone: UTC+5:30 (IST)
- Vehicle registration: UP-14
- Website: up.gov.in

Niwari is a town, near city of Ghaziabad in Ghaziabad district in the Indian state of Uttar Pradesh.

== Geography ==
Niwari is located at 28.88°N 77.53°E. It has an average elevation of 215 metres (705 feet).

== Demographics ==
As of the 2001 Census of India, Niwari had a population of 9919. Males constitute 54% of the population and females 46%. Niwari has an average literacy rate of 62%, higher than the national average of 59.5%: male literacy is 69%, and female literacy is 55%. In Niwari, 15% of the population is under 6 years of age.

=== Schools ===
- Sanjay Gandhi Inter College, Niwari
- Survin International Public School, Niwari
- Siksha International Public School, Niwari

=== Important Links ===
Ghaziabad District Administration ghaziabad.nic.in
