= Neva Foundation =

Swiss foundation

The Neva Foundation is a Swiss non-profit organization based in Geneva. The main objective of the foundation is to promote cultural and scientific exchanges between Russia and Switzerland.

Established in 2008 by Elena Timchenko and her husband, Gennady, the Neva Foundation has, throughout the years, entered into partnership with some of the most renowned cultural institutions and events in Switzerland, including the Geneva Opera and the Verbier Festival.

== Projects and partnerships ==
Since 2008 the Neva Foundation has launched a number of cultural projects and events in Switzerland in order to promote Russian culture and the most talented artists.

In 2010, the Foundation partnered with the Geneva Opera to support and organize the performance of the Mariinski Orchestra of Saint-Petersburg and his world-renowned conductor Valery Gergiev at the Geneva Opera.

The Neva Foundation also supports the Verbier Festival to promote the Russian culture in Switzerland. One of the key initiatives launched jointly is a scholarship program open to young Russian musicians which offers the unique opportunity to perform at the “Verbier Academy".

In November 2011 the Foundation helped Petr Fomenko and Fomenkis to stage the famous plays "Lam and Wolves" and "Family Happiness" in Théâtre de Carouge.

Besides initiating and supporting cultural projects, the Neva Foundation also promotes the Swiss and Russian ties through sports and scientific programs.

The Neva Foundation is the main partner of the Genève Futur Hockey Challenge, an international hockey tournament initiated in Geneva by the Genève-Servette Hockey Club.

The Neva Foundation also teamed up with Lausanne’s Ecole Polytechnique Fédérale (EPFL), one of two Swiss federal institutes of technology. The aim of the partnership was to develop a diabetes research through an exchange program between the Perm State Polytechnic University and EPFL, which will allow science Russian students to come and study in Switzerland.

In 2013, the Neva Foundation launched Kino Film Festival From Russia and Beyond, dedicated to the modern cinematographic production of the Post-Soviet countries. Under the impulse of its artistic director Elena Hazanov, the first edition of the Festival had a big success with the French-speaking Swiss. The Honorary Consulate of the Russian Federation in Lausanne is a partner of this project.

== Bursary for creative projects ==
The Neva Foundation organized a “bursary for creative projects” in order to support "creative projects, be it artistic, musical, literary, or theatrical, having a relation with Russia".

In 2011 the total amount of the bursary was CHF 100’000. The laureates of the bursary were selected in the fields of photography, history and screenplays.

== Organization ==
The Neva foundation is presided by Elena Timchenko.

The organization board of trustees includes Russian director Yuri Temirkanov, French university professor and specialist of Russian literature Georges Nivat and Swiss banker Jean Goutchkov, among others.
