= List of Akagi episodes =

First DVD box set cover

The anime series Tōhai Densetsu Akagi: Yami ni Maiorita Tensai is based on the manga series Akagi: Yami ni Oritatta Tensai written and illustrated by Nobuyuki Fukumoto. The series is directed by Yūzō Satō and co-produced by Nippon Television (NTV), VAP, Forecast and Madhouse. It follows Akagi, a mahjong player who becomes a legend after defeating well versed opponents while still 13-year-old only to return six years later.

The series was originally broadcast between October 5, 2005, and March 29, 2006, on NTV. The 26 episodes were later combined into two DVD box sets, released by VAP on March 24, and May 24, 2006. Streaming service Crunchyroll licensed the anime for an English-language release from September 10, 2013.

The series has three pieces of theme music: a single opening theme and two ending themes. The opening theme is "Nantoka Nare" (何とかなれ) by Furuido. The first ending theme from episodes one to thirteen is "Akagi" by Maximum the Hormone and the second theme for the remaining episodes is "S.T.S." by Animals.

== Episode list ==
No.	Crunchyroll title Japanese title	Directed by	Written by	Original air date
1	"The Genius Who Descended Into the Darkness"; Transliteration: "Yami ni Maiorita Tensai" (Japanese: 闇に舞い降りた天才)	Tomohiko Itō	Hideo Takayashiki	October 5, 2005
A man called Nangō is playing mahjong with three yakuza members, with the risk of being killed if he can not pay the money he is betting. Interrupting the game, a boy called Akagi Shigeru enters, who the yakuza try to expel until Nangō lies about inviting him. Akagi first recommends Nangō to release a tile he was hesitant to put on table, and then, at Nangō's request, sits to play in Nangō's place. While Akagi is playing, the police enters the room, seeking for a teenager who was in a game of chicken. Akagi makes a deal with Nangō, saying he would win if he covered him, which he accepts after seeing that he cheated the yakuza by taking advantage of the police presence on site. Yasuoka, the police chef, sends off his subordinates, and remains to watch the game.
2	"The Awakening of Talent"; Transliteration: "Shishitsu no Kakusei" (Japanese: 資質の覚醒)	Hiroyuki Tanaka	Kazuyuki Fudeyasu	October 12, 2005
Akagi shows an amazing ability for someone who has never played mahjong before, predicting the opponents' tiles by looking at their discards in order to not discard tiles useful for anyone's hand. Seeing the possibility that they may lose to Akagi, Ryūzaki, the yakuza leader, calls the clan's best player, Yagi Keiji. After observing Akagi playing, Yagi makes his own bet of 100,000 yen for round, offering a finger for 100,000 yen as he knows Akagi does not have that amount of money. Akagi does not recede, accepting the bet so long Yagi also parlays the same for his fingers. The game restarts but now instead of game of skills, it is a psychological game, wherein Akagi still appears to be winning.
3	"The Sinister Scheme"; Transliteration: "Itan no Sakuryaku" (Japanese: 異端の策略)	Norio Kashima	Kazuyuki Fudeyasu	October 19, 2005
Akagi and Yagi tie in the first round, and after Akagi wins the second, Yagi cheats to win the third. In the next round Akagi pays back, inducting Yagi to make a losing move by showing one of his tiles on purpose. With this victory, he pays all debts of Nangō, who does not think about anything else but going away. Akagi, however, proposes to continue the game, betting Nangō's three million debt, knowing that the yakuza would not refuse to maintain their reputation. As Akagi easily defeats the scared Yagi, the yakuza now must pay Nangō three million. Akagi wants to double the bet, but Ryūzaki says it is already morning so they cannot continue. Akagi objects but Yasuoka convinces him to agree, assuring the yakuza settle Nangō's debt, owe three million to him, and sign a commitment to a rematch.
4	"A True Outlaw"; Transliteration: "Honmono no Burai" (Japanese: 本物の無頼)	Kenji Nagasaki	Tatsuhiko Urahata	October 26, 2005
Nangō will bet six million on the next Akagi match, and Akagi persuades Yasuoka into betting more two million. On the day of the match, Akagi meets the opponents who want him to give up but Akagi asks an amount they are not disposed to pay. There he meets his adversary, Ichikawa, a blind man who has very accurate hearing. Akagi receives a gun for accepting to attend the match, and to try out Ichikawa's personality, he plays Russian roulette with him, discovering he is calm and self-confident. After the meeting, he pursues the boys who played "chicken" with him, shooting the two legs of the leader and demoralizing the other two by consequence. With all he planned done, he goes to the match.
5	"The Treacherous Tse Ii Men"; Transliteration: "Uragiri no Zetsu Ichimon" (Japanese: 裏切りの絶一門)	Tomohiko Itō	Tatsuhiko Urahata	November 2, 2005
As Akagi was late to arrive at the match's location and because it was impossible to postpone the match, Nangō plays on Akagi's place. A rule that states the match will continue until Ichikawa or Nangō/Akagi expend all of their points is set. Nangō wins the first two rounds, using the simplest strategy but Ichikawa soon understands it and adapts his playing, surpassing Nangō. When Nangō is with a hand wherein any tile he discards would make him lose the match Akagi arrives, taking his place and cheating. After equilibrating the match, Akagi starts to provoke Ichikawa; he discards the pin suits as well as Ichikawa do—a situation called Zetsu Ichimon. With this, they must wait for a sou or character tile to be from a tile of a winning hand (tenpai). The match remains equilibrate but Nangō and Ichikawa notice that while winning almost the same number of rounds, Ichikawa is accumulating more points due to Akagi's cheaper hand wins. If it continues Akagi will lose.
6	"The Picaro's Talent"; Transliteration: "Akkan no Shishitsu" (Japanese: 悪漢の資質)	Hiroyuki Tanaka	Tatsuhiko Urahata	November 9, 2005
Ichikawa now goes on the offensive by targeting Akagi directly, proposing a Zetsu Nimon—the two discard pin and sou tiles. Akagi loses the round but avoids losing the match. In the following round, even with a poor start hand Akagi confuses the opponents by discarding unexpected tiles, making them believe he has a good hand. Uncertain if it is a bluff or not, Ichikawa gives up the win to another player by playing into his hand, thereby robbing Akagi of his chance to win. After consecutive wins, Akagi establish his own points but cannot take away Ichikawa's points. Seeing an endless match, Akagi offers to cut their points down to one tenth—Akagi has 5,000 and Ichikawa has 10,000—, which Ichikawa refuses. Then, Akagi cheats as to force Ichikawa to accept.
7	"An Innocent Devil"; Transliteration: "Mujaki na Akki" (Japanese: 無邪気な悪鬼)	Nanako Shimazaki	Tatsuhiko Urahata	November 16, 2005
Akagi has 6,800 and Ichikawa has 8,100 points; to prevent Akagi winning, Ichikawa deals into the player on his side. Ichikawa goes to 4,600, while Akagi goes to 4,500 and then 1,300 after Ichikawa cheats in the next round to win—which Akagi seems to ignore. After a break, Ichikawa tries to switch Akagi's drawn tile but Akagi stops him. However, Ichikawa changes the dora indicator tile, which in fact Akagi induced him to. As Akagi wins, he wants to double the bet but the yakuza leader, Kurosawa, says Ichikawa is now no match for Akagi. Nangō observes Akagi and sees that his eyes indicate an exclusive level of nerve and intelligence for gambling that he will never attain, convincing Nangō to stop gambling. Five years later, Akagi has since disappeared and become a legend.
8	"The Sign of Rebirth"; Transliteration: "Fukkatsu no Zenchō" (Japanese: 復活の前兆)	Kanji Wakabayashi	Mitsutaka Hirota	November 23, 2005
Six years after the match between Akagi and Ichikawa, Yasuoka presents a man claiming to be Akagi to Kawada, the boss of a yakuza group, of whom requests proof of this Akagi's skill as verification. Impressed with the man's abilities, albeit being uncharacteristic of the Akagi of legend, Ishikawa, the only man of Kawada's who witnessed the legendary match, is thus not sure if the man truly is Akagi. At a later evening, Ishikawa observes a street fight - the victor of which appearing to be the real Akagi, who quickly dashes away after being recognized. Ishikawa contacts Nangō to confirm the identity of the man he found, ultimately discovering the true Akagi working at a local manufacturing plant. After confronting Akagi, Ishikawa brings him to Kawada, yet Kawada dismisses him and insists that the "fake" Akagi is good enough for his gambling clientele, admiring his logical and pragmatic tactics and retaining him as the resident pro player. The phony Akagi proceeds with a demonstration, facing down all 136 tiles and picking random hands of 13 tiles, giving instantly the number of tiles necessary to be in tenpai. The man gives the right answers until he is interrupted by Akagi who, without looking at the tiles, provides the correct answer to the last 19 tiles. The phony Akagi scoffs, explaining in mathematical and statistical terms the ease at which one may arrive at the correct answer, yet the real Akagi consequently intimidates him with a convoluted show of his improbable and seemingly unnatural luck. Thus begins a battle of wits between the two Akagi's.
9	"The Authenticity of Genius"; Transliteration: "Tensai no Shingan" (Japanese: 天才の真贋)	Norio Kashima	Mitsutaka Hirota	November 30, 2005
Akagi gives the correct answer but the fake Akagi says it was only logic, as these were the remaining tiles, and that three was statistically the best answer. Akagi says he is wrong, then the man challenges him: he shows a hand with four shanten and asks Akagi to add three tiles and keep the four shanten. With only 3% of chance of winning, Akagi asks the man to bet his arm but he becomes scared. Then Kawada offers two million against Akagi's salary, which Akagi wins. Akagi returns to his room at the factory, where three man are cheating to win over a newcomer called Osamu. When they are going out, Akagi bets his two millions against their savings. Akagi cheats them, and decides to resign his job. In the next day, on leaving the factory Akagi and Osamu are confronted by the three men.
10	"The Announcement of the Counterattack"; Transliteration: "Gyakushū no Yogen" (Japanese: 逆襲の予言)	Shigetaka Ikeda	Kazuyuki Fudeyasu	December 7, 2005
After Akagi beats them all, Ishikawa arrives and takes him to see a match between fake Akagi and Urabe, a representative player of Fujisawa yakuza group. Fake Akagi is winning but Akagi says that Urabe is losing on purpose; then, when the third of four rounds ends Urabe makes a proposal. He wants to double the bet from 500,00 to 1 million and that the match's bet continues to double until fake Akagi or him be in first place. As the offer is accepted, Urabe won the first round but avoids to grasp the first place to increase the bet. When the bet reaches 16 million, Fujisawa's boss arrives. Fake Akagi wins the penultimate hand of the round, needing only 1,000 points to get in the lead. However, he misses a chance to win and the bet doubles to 32 million.
11	"The Foundation for Despair"; Transliteration: "Zetsubō e no Fuseki" (Japanese: 絶望への布石)	Ryōsuke Nakamura	Kazuyuki Fudeyasu	December 14, 2005
As the fake Akagi is losing, Kawada requests Akagi to play in his place but Akagi refuses, saying he would only play if Osamu plays first. Unaware of the wager, Osamu wins two hands but when he hears about the 32 million bet, he loses his confidence, and then Akagi takes Osamu's place. In the first hand, both Akagi and Urabe ignore their own chances of winning, leading to a tie. Akagi even pays an 8,000 points penalty for concealing his tenpai, stating it will give him the three turns that will decide the match. In the next hand, Akagi declares an open rīchi to force Urabe to compromise. When Urabe discards the tile Akagi needs to win, Akagi does not takes it and wants to continue to accumulate more points.
12	"The Magic of Coincidence"; Transliteration: "Gūki no Mahō" (Japanese: 偶機の魔法)	Nanako Shimazaki	Tatsuhiko Urahata	December 21, 2005
Akagi rejects several opportunities to win, and Urabe wins the hand, widening the difference of points to over 70,000. After several coincidences, Akagi wins the next hand and cuts the difference to 22,500. In the final hand, Akagi induces Urabe to deal the tiles he wants, and finally goes into a naked wait—a single wait with only a tile in the hand. Then, Akagi stands up and goes towards the exit as he says the match is surely won, and Ishikawa can handle it by himself.
13	"The Path of the Storm"; Transliteration: "Fūrai no Kidō" (Japanese: 風雷の軌道)	Kanji Wakabayashi	Tatsuhiko Urahata	January 4, 2006
Urabe discards a 2-pin, which Ishikawa reveals to be the tile Akagi wanted to win. Everyone is stunned and Kawada asks to Akagi to explain how he had sure Urabe would discard it. He used Osamu to learn about Urabe's habits and style of play, while intentionally sacrificing 8,000 points to hide his own skill. Fearing the possibility of losing money that was not his own, Urabe only discarded tiles he thought were safe, which Akagi subtly influenced him to do so. After the match, Urabe is with his hands wounded and swears he will win over Akagi someday. Akagi then proposes a bet: the 32 million debt against Urabe's two hands, to which a dazed Urabe cannot even reply.
14	"A New Chapter of the Rakshasa"; Transliteration: "Rasetsu no Shinshō" (Japanese: 羅刹の新章)	Takao Yotsuji	Hideo Takayashiki	January 4, 2006
When several man are deceased with blood loss extracted from their arm by a serial killer, Yasuoka identifies one of them, Hirayama Yukio, the fake Akagi. It leads him to invite Ōgi, the second in command of the Inada yakuza group, and tell him about his suspect. Yasuoka says Akagi is the one who could defeat the murderer, who is a mahjong player that kills his defeated opponents. Inada says there is someone similar to Akagi playing chō-han on Kurata, a subgroup of Santō, which is also the header of Inada group. There, they find Akagi who almost dies from a sword cut after gambling with yakuza members. After rushing him to a hospital, Yasuoka and Ōgi talk about the case to Akagi, requesting him to play a match against the murderer.
15	"The Witching Hour"; Transliteration: "Ōma ga Toki" (Japanese: 逢魔が時)	Shigetaka Ikeda	Tatsuhiko Urahata	January 11, 2006
Akagi agrees to follow Yasuoka and Ōgi to track down the murderer to play mahjong with him. The murderer is revealed to be Washizu Iwao, a decorated police officer who accumulated wealth through consulting and blackmail who has begun killing people in games of mahjong. On Washizu's mansion, Washizu introduces the "Washizu Mahjong", whose main restriction is that they will be playing with transparent tiles, where only one of the four of a kind in each tile is opaque. The three house rules are then introduced: they will not build walls as per normal rules but draw tiles from a hole in the center of the table, they will wear leather gloves so that they are unable to "feel" which tile they have drawn, and the dealer with initially draw one tile to determine the dora indicator and additional dora will be drawn when the need arises. In addition Washizu states that Akagi will be playing with 2000 cubic centimeters (ccs) of blood as his wager and Washizu will be playing with 20 million yen.
16	"The Mahjong Game of Destruction"; Transliteration: "Hametsu no Tōhai" (Japanese: 破滅の闘牌)	Hiroyuki Tanaka	Kazuyuki Fudeyasu	January 18, 2006
Unfazed, Akagi asks to raise the stakes so that he would be able to witness Washizu's destruction. Enraged at Akagi's arrogance, Washizu demands that Ōgi explain to Akagi that this is not a mere game. Ōgi, however, says that Akagi is different from the previous players and that Washizu's fortune is dwindling in value from all the bribes used to cover up the murders. He then asserts that Washizu should bet his entire fortune of 500 million yen on this match. In reply, Washizu asks that Ōgi bets his own arm; Ōgi fearlessly agrees. However, Ishioka, one of Washizu's henchmen, suggests to add additional insurance by allowing Washizu the choice to opt out or continue every two sessions. The game begins with Akagi winning a cheap hand off of a discard from Yasuoka in his right. Washizu taunts Akagi for opting to winning cheaply but he remains unfazed, though takes note on the validity of what he says.
17	"The Proof of Genius"; Transliteration: "Isai no Shōmei" (Japanese: 異才の証明)	Nanako Shimazaki	Mitsutaka Hirota	January 25, 2006
Akagi earns 1 million yen from Washizu's rīchi from the previous round. Yasuoka plays a discard into Akagi's hand allowing Akagi to win the next round. Yasuoka's own points do not matter as this is primarily a match between Washizu and Akagi. Washizu, annoyed at Akagi's plays, wins the next round off a discard from his henchman to his right. In the next round, Akagi makes progressively more dangerous discards with Washizu applauding him at noticing "the second pond": referring to his henchman's discard pile, meaning that if his henchman does not have Washizu's winning tile, all the henchman's tiles can be considered safe to discard. Regardless, Washizu still draws his winning tile: Akagi has 400 ccs of blood drawn from him. In the next round, Akagi wins off of Washizu's discard: a risky play that impresses Washizu.
18	"The Cursed Tiles"; Transliteration: "Jubaku no Haishi" (Japanese: 呪縛の牌姿)	Ryōsuke Nakamura	Mitsutaka Hirota	February 1, 2006
The match enters the south round. Washizu is in a favorable position, with a single wait for a sanshoku hand and 1 dora. He is convinced in his victory, but ends up dealing into Akagi's hand as soon as he declares rīchi.
19	"The Confusion of the Demon"; Transliteration: "Kishin no Konmei" (Japanese: 鬼神の昏迷)	Tomio Yamauchi	Mitsutaka Hirota	February 8, 2006
It is the final hand of the first round. Washizu is in a situation where he has to discard a dangerous extra tile to Akagi in order to be in tenpai.
20	"Hope and Folly"; Transliteration: "Kibō to Gukō" (Japanese: 希望と愚行)	Kanji Wakabayashi	Tatsuhiko Urahata	February 15, 2006
The first round ends with Akagi in first place. However, Akagi refuses to regain the 1100cc of blood that he lost, instead demanding all his winnings to be redeemed into money, meaning that if Washizu achieves mangan even once, it will mean instant death for Akagi. Ōgi and Yasuoka do not understand his intentions.
21	"A Ray of Illusion"; Transliteration: "Ichiru no Gensō" (Japanese: 一縷の幻想)	Shigetaka Ikeda	Kazuyuki Fudeyasu	February 22, 2006
There is a 9200 point difference between Akagi and Washizu. Washizu makes a meld call on the Hatsu tile, aiming for a hon'itsu hand. With the Xia dora tile, he will achieve haneman with his hon'itsu, hatsu and 3 dora hand. Akagi is certain to die if he falls below Washizu's position. Akagi achieves tenpai in the same round, but his extra tile is a Xia.
22	"The Shackles of Artifice"; Transliteration: "Sakui no Ashikase" (Japanese: 作為の足枷)	Nanako Shimazaki	Kazuyuki Fudeyasu	March 1, 2006
Having read through Washizu's hand, Akagi headbumps the 3-Man tile that Suzuki deals to Washizu. This causes the winnings of the first and second round to reach ¥118,500,000. Akagi explains why he won't replenish his blood. Having relied on Washizu making a mistake to win, Akagi shook awake the feelings of fear sleeping deep within Washizu's mind with his reckless behavior of not transfusing his blood.
23	"The Power of Brute Luck"; Transliteration: "Gōun no Iryoku" (Japanese: 剛運の威力)	Yūzō Satō; Hiroyuki Tanaka; Kanji Wakabayashi	Mitsutaka Hirota	March 8, 2006
The third round begins. Washizu has a hunch that he will reach the highest point in his life if he kills Akagi. In the first east round, Akagi gets an early self-drawn haneman win. It is Washizu's turn to be dealer in the second east round.
24	"The Will of the Demons"; Transliteration: "Mamono no Ishi" (Japanese: 魔物の意思)	Tomio Yamauchi; Nanako Shimazaki	Mitsutaka Hirota	March 15, 2006
Washizu's hand takes the form of 6 dora tiles. If he gets a self-drawn dealer baiman win, Akagi will die. Washizu finally gets to see Akagi's face trembling in despair.
25	"The Temptation of Murderous Intent"; Transliteration: "Satsui no Yūwaku" (Japanese: 殺意の誘惑)	Hiroyuki Tanaka	Hideo Takayashiki	March 22, 2006
Washizu's hand takes the form of 12 dora tiles. If he gets a self-drawn dealer counted yakuman win, Akagi will have 1600cc of blood drained from him, far exceeding the lethal dose.
26	"Madness and Darkness and..." Transliteration: "Kyōki to Yami to..." (Japanese: 狂気と闇と…)	Yūzō Satō	Hideo Takayashiki	March 29, 2006
Having escaped from the dire situation, Akagi instantly takes on an offensive stance against Washizu. Washizu completely loses his composure from Akagi's words. Akagi continues shooting Washizu down, winning the third and fourth rounds. In a state of total exhaustion, Washizu's consciousness grows dim and he collapses. The fight appears to be over, or so everyone thought.
