= Kokushi =

Kokushi can refer to:

- 国師 - lit. Teacher of the Realm, an official or honorary title given to Buddhist masters in Japan
- 国司 - Kokushi (official), in the government of Classical Japan
- 国師 - Kokushi (regent), the government of the Ryūkyū Kingdom, akin to regent and often translated as "state instructor"
- 国史 - Kokushi (history), a type of Japanese historical writing that emerged in the Meiji period
- 国士無双 - A yakuman in the game of mahjong
- Keiji Mutoh - a Japanese wrestler who uses "Kokushi" as his name in the ring.
