= Mudazumo Naki Kaikaku =

Japanese manga series

- First tankōbon volume cover, featuring Junichiro Koizumi

ムダヅモ無き改革
- Genre: Mahjong; Parody; Political
- Manga
- Written by: Hideki Ohwada
- Published by: Takeshobo
- English publisher: NA: Mahjong Pros Publishing
- Magazine: Kindai Mahjong Original; Kindai Mahjong
- Original run: 2006 – 2015
- Volumes: 16
- Original video animation
- Directed by: Tsutomu Mizushima
- Produced by: Kōhei Kawase; Tsuneo Taketomo; Ryōsuke Naya; Mamoru Minagawa
- Written by: Hideki Ohwada; Tsutomu Mizushima
- Music by: Ryūji Takagi
- Studio: TYO Animations
- Released: February 26, 2010
- Runtime: 8 minutes
- Episodes: 3
- Manga

Mudazumo Naki Kaikaku: Legend of Koizumi
- Written by: Hideki Ohwada
- Published by: Takeshobo
- Magazine: Kindai Mahjong Original; Kindai Mahjong
- Original run: August 12, 2017 – present
- Volumes: 5

Mudazumo Naki Kaikaku (ムダヅモ無き改革, Reform with No Wasted Draws; also known in English by its initial subtitle The Legend of Koizumi) is a Japanese satirical mahjong manga series by Hideki Ohwada. It was initially irregularly serialized in the Kindai Mahjong Original manga magazine published by Takeshobo, then switched to bimonthly serialization on Takeshobo's other mahjong manga magazine Kindai Mahjong in April 2009. An anime adaptation was released on February 26, 2010, as an original video anime.

The premise of the manga is that international diplomacy is settled on the mahjong table, with real-life politicians depicted as masters of mahjong. The Japanese title is a parody of Junichiro Koizumi's slogan, "Reform with No Sanctuary" (聖域無き改革, Seiiki Naki Kaikaku).

In June 2025, Mahjong Pros opened a publishing imprint and announced that they had licensed the series for English publication beginning in Q4 2025.

== Plot ==
In a world where all politics and diplomacy are settled via no-holds-barred mahjong battles by world politicians, Junichiro Koizumi settled scores with the United States, North Korea, and Russia before retiring as Prime Minister of Japan. However, he is recruited by the Vatican to be one of the five world leaders to counter a new international threat: the Nazis, still alive, who settled on the Moon and established the Fourth Reich. The Nazis challenge the world leaders to a best-of-five mahjong match to the death on the Guiana Highlands, but the battle is interrupted by the news of a rebellion on the Moon. After Adolf Hitler returned from the match on Earth and put down Erwin Rommel's rebellion, he beckons Koizumi to the Moon to finish the match. After a tremendous battle, Hitler is defeated while Koizumi becomes stranded on the Moon, his fate unknown. After Koizumi is presumed dead on the moon, the Japanese government under the Liberal Democratic Party (LDP) established the 13th Autonomous Mahjong Corps (MJ-13) in an effort to make up for the loss of Japanese mahjong power. However, the LPD lost the 2009 elections to the Democratic Party of Japan (DPJ), who promptly tried to eliminate the newly established corps in the name of fiscal restructuring. The MJ-13, headed by Koizumi's hidden son Matajiro Sanada, duels three mahjong greats selected by the DPJ in a battle to decide the fate of the corps. Sanada defeats the incumbent prime minister Yukio Hatoyama in the last round, which causes the latter to lose power. It is then revealed that the LDP is planning to retrieve Koizumi from the Moon through Japan's space agency JAXA, and that MJ-13 was established to prepare for an upcoming war.

A challenge is issued to Japan to send five mahjong greats to the disputed Senkaku Islands, where a mysterious "red box" is threatening the safety of nearby fishermen. The ruling DPJ does not want to get involved in the controversy for fear of angering their Chinese masters, to the point of sending ninja assassins to try to kill Sanada, who desires to sail to the islands to investigate. Eventually, in the face of falling public support, the DPJ strikes a deal with the LDP to call an election early, which the LDP wins and promptly sends the MJ-13 to the Senkaku Islands. There they discover an abandoned Kuznetsov-class aircraft carrier being overtaken by Red Guards, and a preserved Mao Zedong inside the dreaded "red box". Mao challenges Japan to five mahjong matches, with each of the 5 main islands of the Senkaku Islands being the wager. Mao cites his ambition to claim the islands for his Neo Chinese Soviet Republic and eventually reclaim China from its current leaders, who he thinks have betrayed the communist cause. After Japan defeats Mao, winning all matches along the way, Lenin himself summons the mysterious figure "Mask of Mahjong" as his aide to challenge Japan to a final match. The "Mask of Mahjong" defeats Lenin in the first round, and is revealed to be Junichiro Koizumi being controlled by the head of Leon Trotsky. The war ends with the ambitions of the Neo Chinese Soviet Republic broken, and Koizumi and Sanada reuniting as father and son, both acknowledging each other's mahjong powers.

After a two-year hiatus since the end of the "Senkaku Islands Bloody Battle" arc, the manga resumed in 2017 with a sequel centering on the imperial princess Hako Mikado (御門葩子) playing against foreign adversaries such as American president Donald Trump.

== Characters ==
Though based on real-life politicians, the characters are, as the manga's disclaimer notes, "works of fiction and not really related to any real-life people".

=== Japan ===
==== Liberal Democratic Party (LDP) ====
Junichiro Koizumi (小泉 ジュンイチロー, Koizumi Jun'ichirō)
The Prime Minister of Japan, the main protagonist of the story's first arc. Armed with a natural talent for mahjong, passed down from his grandfather Matajiro Koizumi, Junichiro defends Japanese interests and integrity against the heads of the world's superpowers, even after his retirement from politics. Signature skills include "Goumoupai" (轟盲牌, scraping tiles with a tight grip to make white tiles, or change the numerical value of tiles), "Rising Sun", a 13-tile wait (Kokushi Musou) won by Tsumo with the 1-Pin, symbolizing the Japanese sun, and "The Beginning of the Universe" (all white) which is the single highest scoring hand in the series. He is voiced by Toshiyuki Morikawa in the anime adaptation.
Taizō Sugimura (杉村 タイゾー, Sugimura Taizō)
Member of the Japanese Diet who is perhaps overly eager and enthusiastic about the privileges of being a Diet member and admits his greatest fear is losing his status and "going back to being a NEET". He was held hostage by the Americans twice to lure Koizumi to the mahjong table. Though doubted by his peers who think he won his seat by fluke, Koizumi acknowledges Taizō as a bringer of luck. He appears in "The Blood Relatives of a Lion" arc as the trainer for the 13th Autonomous Mahjong Corps. He plays better when in his underwear, a reference to when he was stripped during early chapters by Koizumi's opponents. He is voiced by Jun Fukuyama in the anime adaptation.
Yukari-tan (ゆかりタン)
Another Diet member, she appears as the Prime Minister's aide and provides relevant commentary about the state of affairs on the mahjong table. Harbours hidden feelings for Koizumi, which she knows will be unrequited. She is voiced by Shizuka Itō in the anime adaptation.
Tarō Asō (麻生 タロー, Asō Tarō)
The Minister for Foreign Affairs who eventually becomes the Prime Minister of Japan. Known as an able sharpshooter (since he represented the Japanese shooting team in the 1976 Summer Olympics) and plays mahjong in support for Koizumi. He is voiced by Kinryū Arimoto in the anime adaptation.
Shinzō Abe (安倍 シンゾー, Abe Shinzō)
The Prime Minister of Japan. In a game against Russian president Vladimir Putin, he places Koizumi's son Kotaro Koizumi in place of his missing father. The swap is seen through by Putin, and Abe is shamed into committing seppuku. The public was told that he resigned due to diarrhea. He returns as prime minister in 2012, his abdomen now reinforced with metal.
Shigeru Ishiba (石破 シゲル, Ishiba Shigeru)
Former Japanese Minister of Defense and now Secretary-General of the LDP. As Minister of Defense, he creates the 13th Autonomous Mahjong Corps to compensate the drop in Japan's mahjong might due to Koizumi's absence. It is at his suggestion that the Corps' funding be cut, so that the Corps' mahjong training can be put to the test in their struggle to save the unit.
Sadakazu Tanigaki (谷垣サダカズ, Tanigaki Sadakazu)
The leader of the LPD when the party became the opposition party. Despite his bookish demeanour, he wields mahjong power befitting of a party leader, to Matajiro Sanada's surprise when Tarō Asō called a match to test Sanada's power. Winning hands include the "Cosmic Cycler" (Four concealed triplets).

==== Democratic Party of Japan (DPJ) ====
Naoto Kan (菅 ナヲト)
Once leader of the opposition, he made his first appearance sexually harassing Yukari-tan. Obsessed with transfer of power when the LDP was in power. As one of the power brokers of the DPJ, he is not above making under-the-table deals with the LDP to ensure the interests of his party and those of his own.
Yukio Hatoyama (鳩山 ユキヲ, Hatoyama Yukio)
Prime Minister of Japan, first of the Democratic Party of Japan to put the traditional Liberal Democratic Party out of power. In the OVA, he is an obedient puppet to the Chinese leadership. It turns out he acts this way because he had been infested by a squid-like alien. In the manga, he is the primary antagonist of "The Blood Relatives of a Lion" arc and a puppet leader assuming the form of a Flatwoods monster pushed to the fore by the DPJ brassmen. Known for his political gaffes, which are referenced in his play style, where he commits Chombo (foul plays that force all players to rebuild their hands) when he gets unfavorable hands before winning all his points back with one high scoring hand. Voiced by Keiji Fujiwara in the OVA.
Miyuki Hatoyama (鳩山ミユキ, Hatoyama Miyuki)
The alien-like wife of Yukio Hatoyama. She is his partner in the manga and reveals that she is a skilled player in her own right, having played in seedy underground mahjong parlors, which is reflected in her tendency to threaten her opponents. Despite her rough language and her and her husband's otherworldly behavior, it is made clear that she and Yukio love each other deeply. Voiced by Hitomi Nabatame in the OVA.
Renhō (レンホー)
The State Minister of Government Revitalization, she relentlessly screens the numerous bureaus established by the LPD, including the 13th Autonomous Mahjong Corps, as part of the fiscal restructuring by the new DPJ government. She challenged the corps to three mahjong matches with the nation's mahjong greats of her choosing to decide the fate of the Mahjong Corps. Being the second player of these three matches, her exaggeratedly propped up collars served as receivers of secret communication signals from her sister Rinhō (リンホー) across the table.

==== Social Democratic Party (SDP) ====
Mizupo Fukushima (福島 みずぽ)
The Social Democratic Party representative. Once opposed the rocket carrying Koizumi to the moon on the grounds that it might be used militarily, against the constitution of Japan, but was ignored by the main characters. She later appeared alongside Takako Doi in the first of three matches to decide the fate of the 13th Autonomous Mahjong Corps.
Takako Doi (土井 タカコ)
Former leader of the SDP known for her ultra-pacifist stance, hence hearing the words "Japan Self-Defense Forces" irritates her like hives on her skin. She is especially transfixed on the number 9, "the number that spells the demise of the Self-Defense Forces", a fact that is readily apparent when she plays on the mahjong table.

==== 13th Autonomous Mahjong Corps ====
Matajiro Sanada (真田 又次郎)
Main character of "The Blood Relatives of a Lion" and "Battle for Senkaku Islands" arcs. Originally the captain and commander of the Japan Maritime Self-Defense Force Destroyer Takao scouring the Indian Ocean for Somalian pirates, he got enlisted into the newly established 13th Autonomous Mahjong Corps for his mahjong skills. Unbeknownst to him, he is Junichiro Koizumi's illegitimate son. Signature skills include Fire "Riichi" (using the Goumanpai 轟盲牌 and switching the neighboring tile with his opponents's next draw), Tomahawk Attack, and Blast Off Riichi.
Okumura (奥村)
A stoic and musclebound Sergeant First Class of the Japan Ground Self-Defense Force 1st Airborne Brigade. Despite his foul mouth, he dedicates his lives to the safety of the Japanese people.
Reiji Inui (乾 怜視)
An engineering officer from the Technical Research and Development Institute of the Ministry of Defense. A "human computer" who "sold his soul to science", he wears tesla coils up his sleeves to optically jam his opponents' vision of the mahjong tiles (based on the Philadelphia Experiment), and has phenomenal powers of computation, able to calculate whatever hand his opponents have assembled.

==== Others ====
Hideki Yukawa (湯川 ヒデキ)
A foul-mouthed quantum physicist leading the Super-Kamiokande to monitor the neutrinos emitted by mahjong activities. He discovered the secrets of Super Aryan Hitler's "Heisenburg Strike", a devastating move that merges parallel worlds through quantum superpositioning, making one win count as eight consecutive wins, a pārenchan (八連荘).
The Three Goddesses of Mount Osore (恐山の三女神)
Three blind itako residing in the sacred Mount Osore, able to channel dead spirits onto themselves as spirit media. Sought by the Japanese government to find a way to defeat Hitler, the itako summoned the three mahjong greats of the Yalta Conference who defeated Hitler in the past: Winston Churchill, Franklin D. Roosevelt, and Josef Stalin. The itako's life energies gave out after accomplishing this feat and died.
Ayano Shijō (四條 絢乃)
A young woman working for JAXA who handled all communications to and from the moon during Koizumi's match with Hitler through ASIMO. After demonstrating her determination against JAXA being scrapped, she played alongside Reiji Inui in the match against Renhō. Despite knowing nothing about mahjong beforehand, she compensated by speedreading mahjong guide books and used her intellect to devastating effect during the match.
ASIMO (アシモ, Ashimo)
Humanoid robot created by Honda in 2000. It appears as Koizumi's partner in his match with Hitler and Tristan on the Fourth Reich's Moon base. It has the ability to change the appearance of tiles using a holographic projector, among other "ASIMO weapons." It returns in as Sanada's aide in the final match against Lenin and the mysterious "Mask of Mahjong".
Usagi Aoi (蒼井うさぎ)
A former idol of the Shōwa era who insists she's still active. She enjoys immense popularity throughout Asia, even among the Communist Chinese Red Guards. She fights against the Neo Chinese Soviet Republic in a mahjong match as part of a plea bargain to clear her drug-related charges. Her character is based on Noriko Sakai.

=== United States ===
George W. Bush (ジョージ・W・ブッシュ, Jōji W Busshu)
The 43rd President of the United States, a gambling prodigy since his days in Texas. A man who believes that the ends justify the means. During a game of mahjong against Koizumi in a Japan-U.S. summit in Okinawa, where the stakes are an F-15 Eagle for every 1000 points, Bush suffered a humiliating defeat despite ganging up on Koizumi 3-on-1. He played Koizumi again in Dallas with his father, but lost again. His moves include "Patriot Tsumo" and "Bush Doctrine Riichi". He is voiced by Nobuo Tobita in the anime adaptation.
George H. W. Bush (ジョージ・H・W・ブッシュ, Jōji H W Busshu)
The 41st President of the United States, often referred to as "Papa Bush". In his mind, he was disgraced by the Japanese twice: the first is when he was being shot down above Ogasawara in World War II, the second is when his son was defeated in Okinawa on the mahjong table. He summoned Koizumi to the Texas School Book Depository in Dallas (by kidnapping Taizō) in order to settle the score with mahjong. In the end, he sacrificed himself to save his son from dying at the mahjong table against Skorzeny. His special move is the "Apocalypse Now Ron" (where "ron" is winning by picking a discard). He is voiced by Tesshō Genda in the anime adaptation.
Powell (パウエル, Paueru)
The former United States Secretary of State. He utilized the advanced technologies of the United States to catch people cheating in mahjong. He served during Papa Bush's match against Koizumi and Bush's match against Skorzeny, and both times he and his high-tech unit failed to detect the true nature of their opponent's sleight-of-hands.
Hillary Clinton (ヒラリー・クリントン, Hirarī Kurinton)
Also formerly Secretary of Foreign Ministry of the United States. Defeated by Trump in the election in Mahjong, she was exhausted and forced to retire after the events.
Donald Trump (ドナルド・トランプ, Donarudo Toranpu)
The 45th President of the United States, who himself has his power of building walls and regarded as a tyrannical, arrogant man. However, it is revealed that his arrogance is just a facade, and he deliberately lost the match against Hako Mikado to test her strength and prepare to defeat a hitherto unknown foe.

=== Democratic People's Republic of Korea ===
General Kim (金将軍, Kimu-shōgun)
The leader of North Korea. A rogue who uses underhanded tactics to ensure his own victory, such as attempting to assassinate his opponent Koizumi in order to incapacitate him. He is also a sore loser, as seen when he lost against Koizumi and Aso, he launches a missile in retaliation. His special move is the "Democratic People's Riichi", where he declares riichi while discarding a north tile. He was blown overboard the USS George H. W. Bush by jet engine exhausts after his loss and had most of his body eaten by sharks, but he returned as a mechanical cyborg. He is voiced by Misugi Ootori in the anime.
Jong-nam (正男, Jonnamu)
The eldest son of General Kim. He replaces the anonymous North Korean official for the mahjong match on the USS George H.W. Bush for the OVA. He wears Mickey Mouse ears (in reference for his real-life attempt to sneak into Japan "to visit Disneyland" using a false identity) and is shown to have relations with Macau. He is voiced by Wataru Takagi.

=== Russian Federation ===
Vladimir Putin (ウラジーミル・プーチン, Urajīmiru Pūchin)
The second President of Russia who rose from being a KGB officer. A stoic man who mastered judo and sambo, and hid needles in his hands. He came to Japan to play mahjong with the members of the Japanese Diet as part of a Russo-Japanese Summit, sending Japan into massive debt with his winning streak. Special moves include "Kolkhoz Riichi" and the "Baltic Fleet" (Four quads of bamboo tiles, worth 1,583,296,743,997,800 points in total because they were playing without point limits) as well as the "Siberian Express Ron". He is voiced by Jōji Nakata in the anime adaptation.
Dmitry Medvedev (ドミートリー・メドヴェージェフ, Domītorī Medovējefu)
Third Russian President, playing a secondary position to Putin in the match against Wagner. To support Putin, he used the "Sovkhoz Riichi" to fool Reinhard into thinking that Medvedev has more than he put up. In the end, Medvedev sacrificed himself so that Putin could finish his "Siberian Express" (Nine gates).

=== United Kingdom ===
Margaret Thatcher (マーガレット・サッチャー, Māgaretto Satchā)
Former British Prime Minister who came to watch the Russo-Japanese match in the secret basement of the National Diet Building. Had once played Papa Bush with the depleted uranium tiles Putin and Koizumi were playing with.

=== The Vatican ===
Pietro (ピエトロ, Pietoro)
A white knight serving the pope, playing as his aide on the mahjong table. Once saved Koizumi from a North Korean abduction and led him to the battle in the Vatican.
Benedict XVI (ベネディクト16世, Benedikuto Jūroku-sei)
The Pope 265th of the Vatican. Summoned Koizumi to test his strength in order to counter a new global threat. Capable of walking on thin air and reenacting the first seven days of the Genesis on the mahjong table, accompanied by a boys choir. His special moves are the "Sainte-Trinite" (DaiSanGen) and "Logos" (All honors).

=== Ukraine ===
Yulia Tymoshenko (ユリア・ティモシェンコ, Yuria Timoshenko)
The 13th Ukrainian Prime Minister. A woman of many faces. She was recommended by Putin to be one of the Earth representatives in place of Margaret Thatcher because of her health concerns, since Tymoshenko was the strongest woman in Europe in Putin's mind. Putin calls her a gas witch. A warrant is issued for her arrest, and it is shown that she is in prison by the end of the series. She is voiced by Rina Satō in the anime adaptation.
Eleonora Pavlichenko (エレオノーラ・パヴリチェンコ, Ereonōra Pavurichenko)
Aid to Tymoshenko, who Eleonora calls "big sister". Like Tymoshenko, she has some skills at rolling the dice.

=== Fourth Reich ===
Otto Skorzeny (オットー・スコルツェニー, Ottō Sukorutsenī)
Once called the "Most Dangerous Man in Europe", Skorzeny was the one who infiltrated the Vatican to bring a message from the Fourth Reich. After Earth's leaders accepted Hitler's challenge, Skorzeny returned by a Nazi UFO. He, along with Rudel, are Papa Bush's opponents for the third match between the Earth Alliance and the Fourth Reich. He is killed by Powell's snipers when he is caught cheating; he is unrepentant, taking a puff of his cigarette and telling Powell to "Eat shit and die." before being shot, he survives long enough to defeat Bush and Powell before dying of his wounds. Signature moves include "Operation Greif" (All terminals and honors), "Operation Panzerfaust" (Three colour triplets), and "Operation Eiche" (a riichi in coordination with Rudel's hand).
Richard Wagner (リヒャルト・ワーグナー, Rihyaruto Wāgunā)
The immensely arrogant "King of Opera" that Hitler admired. He was revived by Josef Mengele so that he can participate in the showdown against Earth's leaders. His winning hands are Ring of Nibelung (Four quads, where each quad is an opera of the cycle), Tannhäuser (Seven pairs), Meistersinger (All simples three colors straight no-points hand with three ura dora), and Lohengrin (Single suit hand).
Reinhard (ラインハルト, Rainharuto)
Wagner's partner in the match against Putin and Medvedev. Despite trying to complete his mission to defeat the Russians, Reinhard's advances did not impress the prideful Wagner. Though a loyal officer himself, he is not able to comprehend Medvedev's act of self-sacrifice.
Josef Mengele (ヨーゼフ・メンゲレ, Yōzefu Mengere)
The demonic doctor otherwise known as the "Angel of Death". An overall perfectionist who has a deep fascination with twins and the medical sciences. He was able to accomplish a number of medicinal feats that include biological engineering, human cloning, and resurrection. Hands include "Where are the twins?!" (Seven pairs) and "Designer children" (Single suit seven pairs), exemplifying his obsession with twins.
Mariel (マリエル, Marieru)
Mengele's personal nurse attendant. She had been biologically engineered so that she could determine the mahjong tiles by only using her ears, restructure mahjong walls with invisible speed, and serve as the new host of Mengele's brain.
Hans-Ulrich Rudel (ハンス・ウルリッヒ・ルーデル, Hansu Ururihhi Rūderu)
The much-feared "King of Airstrikes" who is also the "Greatest Enemy of the Soviet People". His battlefield experiences as an ace pilot have led to a heightened sense of awareness that allowed him to sense the situations on the mahjong table. Specializes in coordinated air and land attacks, signified with his hands "Nosedive Bomber" (Straight through) and "Iron Crossfire" (Balkenkreuz; in coordination with Skorzeny's riichi).
Adolf Hitler (アドルフ・ヒトラー, Adorufu Hitorā)
The main antagonist of the original series and charismatic Führer of Nazi Germany and "The Greatest Evil of the 20th Century" who is capable of making people with insufficient resistance into willing followers with a glance. Can turn into a "Super Aryan". He is killed during a duel with Koizumi and ASIMO by Koizumi's final Rising Sun, his soul is then dragged into an eternal game of Mahjong against the spirits of the Allied Leaders.
Tristan Goebbels (トリスタン・ゲッベルス, Torisutan Gebberusu)
The fictional grandson of Joseph Goebbels, a Hitler Youth born on the moon, making him a mondenkind. Plays alongside Hitler against Koizumi. Like Hitler, he can also transform into a "Super Aryan".
Isolde Goebbels (イゾルデ・ゲッベルス, Izorude Gebberusu)
The twin sister of Tristan Goebbels. Plays as Hitler's partner against Benedict XVI. She made her escape from the lunar "Valhalla" when it crumbled after Hitler's defeat.
Erwin Rommel (エルヴィン・ロンメル, Eruvin Ronmeru)
German Field Marshal of World War II. Tried to rebel against Hitler but was defeated on the mahjong table.
Hans Speidel (ハンス・シュパイデル, Hansu Shupaideru)
German general during World War II. Plays alongside Rommel, but is killed by Hitler for his deprecatory remark against the pope, who Hitler had defeated.

=== People's Republic of China ===
President Hu (コ主席, Ko-shuseki)
The 6th President of China in the anime-original story. Immensely proud of China's long history and recent technological advances. Voiced by Banjō Ginga.
Premier Wen (オン首相, On-shushō)
The Premier of China in the anime-original story. In the match against Japan on the Three Gorges Dam, he uses computer technology and Baidu to calculate the probability of Koizumi's hand being the Rising Sun. Voiced by Rokurō Naya.
Xi Jinping (習キンペイ, Shū Kinpei)
Current General Secretary of the Chinese Communist Party, the 7th President of China and leader of the "God Seven", the highest authority in China. Though shown to be the shadowy masters of the DPJ, Xi himself is afraid of the "Red Box" being opened in the Senkaku Islands.

=== Tibet ===
Dalai Lama (ダライラマ法王, Darairama Hōō)
The 14th Dalai Lama. Having predicted the resurrection of Mao Zedong through his mandala, he joined the battle against the Neo Chinese Soviet Republic. His special technique is the "Four-armed Kannon", where he utilizes his invisible mahjong aura in the form of arms to switch tiles into his hand.

=== Neo Chinese Soviet Republic ===
Mao Zedong (毛沢東, Mō Takutō)
The founder of the People's Republic of China and main antagonist in the anime-original story. Throughout his life he had hoped to turn China into lush green farmlands, so he brought this grudge back to the land of the living (represented by All greens) in the mahjong match against Koizumi in Tiananmen Square. Voiced by Kenji Utsumi in the anime adaptation. In the manga, he revived as the leader of the Neo Chinese Soviet Republic, hoping to win the Senkaku Islands from Japan and oust the current "capitalist" Chinese Communist Party in a new Cultural Revolution.
Pol Pot (ポル・ポト, Poru Poto)
Plays alongside Chairman Mao in the match against Koizumi in the anime-original story. Can be influenced by Mao to give him the tile he wants. In the manga, he plays the second round after Guzmán and can control slime molds from the Cambodian jungles to camouflage mahjong tiles.
Sengoku (センゴク)
A Japanese Socialist seeking to form the Neo Chinese Soviet Republic on the Senkaku Islands and start a cultural revolution in Japan. Provides commentary.
Abimael Guzmán (アビマエル・グスマン)
The Peruvian leader of the Maoist guerilla organization Shining Path, smuggled out of life imprisonment by the Neo Chinese Soviet Republic to play mahjong against Japan. Feared for his "Mad Dog" style of play that makes him bite people, even his teammates, for their tiles.
Jiang Qing (江青, Kō Sei)
A former idol of 1920s Shanghai who later rose to power during the Cultural Revolution as the third wife of Mao Zedong. She plays against Usagi Aoi in the third round of mahjong to decide the sovereignty of the Sengoku Islands, and kept seeing Usagi as her former actress rival Wang Ying.
Zhou Enlai (周恩来, Shū Onrai)
Aide to Mao Zedong during his match against the Dalai Lama. Though he caters to Mao to the point of helping him change clothes, he betrays Mao in the last round.
Lenin (レーニン)
The final opponent in the match against the Neo Chinese Soviet Republic, the founder of the original Soviet Republic. Due to errors in his resurrection, his face and speech became cat-like.
Leon Trotsky (レオン・トロツキー)
The founder of the Red Army, and was formerly second to Lenin before he was ousted by Stalin. He merged his head with the body of Junichiro Koizumi and appeared in Lenin's mahjong match as "Mask of Mahjong". Since "Mask of Mahjong" is essentially two people in one, he can nullify incoming mahjong attacks while dealing massive damage to his opponents, two theoretically opposite traits.

== Media ==
=== Anime ===
In August 2009, an anime version of Mudazumo Naki Kaikaku was announced with the release of the second bound volume of the manga. The anime, released on February 26, 2010, is in the form of an OVA with three episodes, the first being an adaptation of a manga arc and the other two being new stories written by Hideki Ohwada. Episode 1 was uploaded onto YouTube and Nico Nico Douga on December 30, 2009, by the producer Kōsei Kawase since they "have no money so [they're] borrowing server space".

== Reception ==
The first bound volume of the manga was published on September 5, 2008. In three days, the manga was sold out throughout the bookstores of Tokyo, and Takeshobo had to print additional shipments five days after the first publish date. The manga also sold out on Amazon.co.jp, where the manga once placed among the top 3 on its daily sales rankings. By November, Takeshobo reported that the first volume sold over 150,000 copies. By the end of the series, 2,500,000 copies were sold in total. News commentators attributed the manga's sales to the enduring popularity of the former Prime Minister Koizumi and an increasing awareness of politics in Japan. The manga has been recommended by Japanese politicians Tarō Asō and Shigeru Ishiba, both of them caricatured in the manga.
