= Yaku (Japanese mahjong) =

Conditions that determine the value of the player's hand

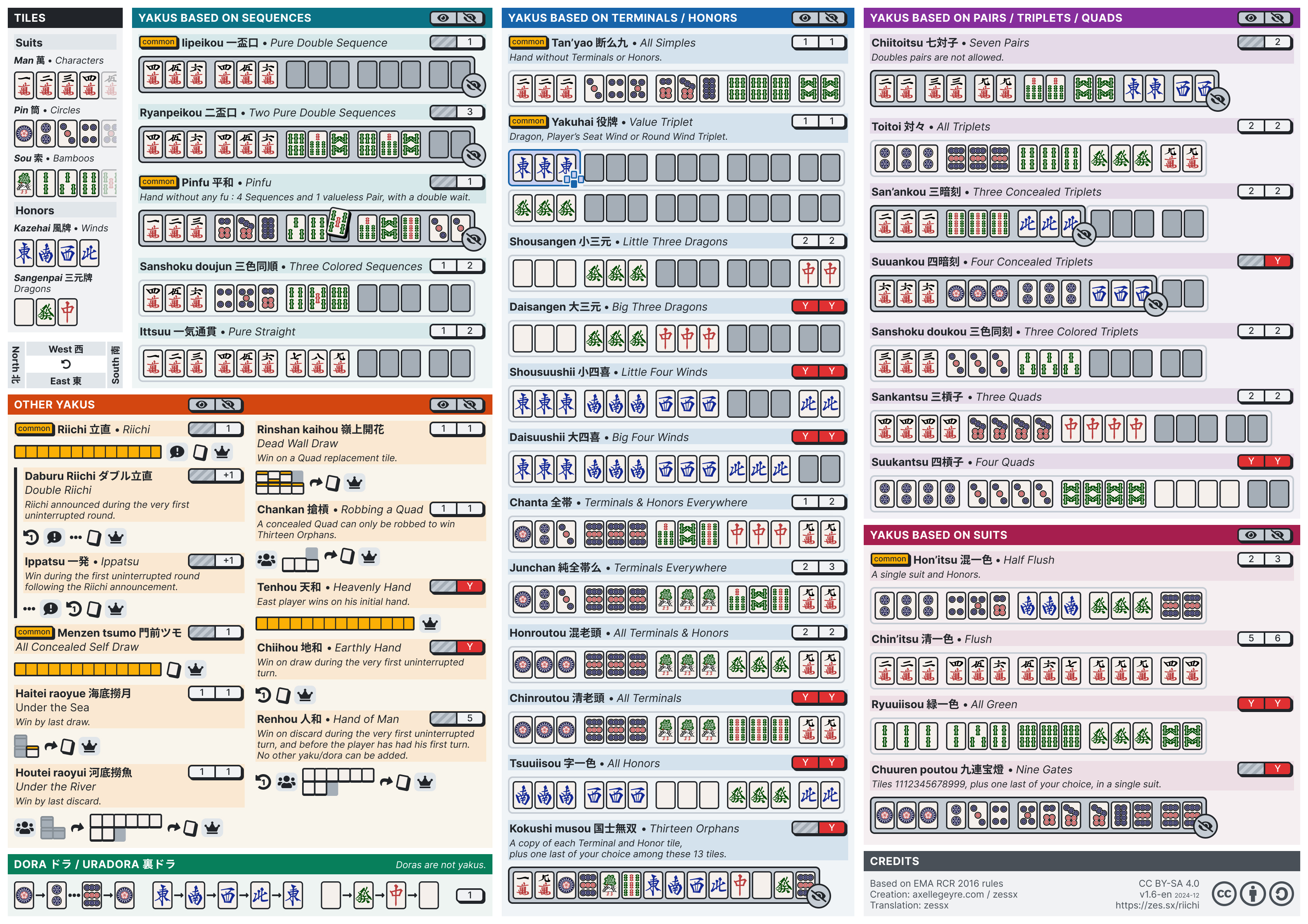
Table of yaku patterns

In Japanese mahjong, yaku (Japanese: 役) are patterns of tiles present in a winning hand that will award it han points. Yaku are one of two ways to add han to a winning hand, the other being dora. Any winning hand must satisfy at least one yaku. Multiple yaku may be combined to produce hands of greater value. A hand's point value is doubled with every han up to the mangan limit (2000 base points), after which scores no longer increase exponentially.

A special class of yaku exist which immediately bring a hand to the maximum rank of yakuman. These yakuman patterns do not stack with lower yaku, but may stack with other yakuman under some rules (allowing a single hand to be ranked as a multiple of yakuman). The yakuman patterns are exceedingly rare in competitive play, some to the point of obscurity.

== Overview ==
Yaku are somewhat similar to poker hands. They fit certain patterns based on the numbers or types of tiles included, as well as the relative value of the tiles. Unlike poker, however, multiple yaku may be combined to produce hands of greater value. The same applies to limit hands or yakuman, which separate from yaku and dora.

The basic concept of a yaku is that it fits into one of three basic criteria:

- It contains a pattern of some kind
- It can consistently be formed during a game, although it does not necessarily need to be common
- It is based on specific game situations, such as discards or actions taken by the players

Finally, when it comes to points scoring, the total number of han in the hand is counted. When the han value is 4 or less, fu is also counted. The combination of the han value and fu value corresponds to a points table.

Regular yaku hands are valued between 1 and 6 han and can be stacked along with dora to a certain value:

- Haneman (1.5× mangan), between six and seven han;
- Baiman (2× mangan), between eight and ten han;
- Sanbaiman (3× mangan), between 11 and 12 han; and
- Kazoe-yakuman (数え役満) (4× mangan), at least 13 han (if the ruleset disables this, then it is treated as a sanbaiman instead.)

=== Open and closed hands ===
All hands start closed. A hand becomes open as soon as the player "calls" a tile discarded by an opponent, in order to complete a group from their own hand. This is called "melding." For example, if a player has in their hand, and an opponent discards a, the first player may call the discard, and thus create a melded triplet. This process can also create melded sequences (e.g. 2-3-4 of the same suit), and open quads. The calling player must display the completed group by placing the tiles face-up on the table. This makes the hand "open".

Because no open hand can become closed, certain yaku combinations either reduce its value by one if the hand is open ("Eat and decrease", a literal translation of kuisagari, 喰い下がり), or deemed impossible to complete due to the yaku requiring its hand to be closed (menzen-nomi, 門前のみ).

The only time a player can call an opponent's discard and still have their hand remain closed is when they are calling the winning tile. For scoring purposes (specifically the "Three / Four Concealed Triplets" yakus), the group with the winning called tile is considered open, but the overall hand stays closed (menzenchin 門前清 or menzen 門前). Due to the way the system works in melds, any meld declaration, including calls for a closed quad, will also nullify the yakus for Blessing of Heaven, Blessing of Earth and One-shot, as these hand would require within one-round in play without calling any melds, and a closed quad is also a meld; this is unlike rules from Hong Kong or Taiwan for example whereas melds are allowed and does not void these hands.

=== Limit hands ===
The other set of hands are called limit hands (yakuman (役満, or yaku-mangan 役満貫),) which are separate from regular hands hence any limit hands do not include regular hands towards the count due to the stringent criteria (as in the scoring in Hong Kong mahjong), though in most rulesets allowing multiple limit hands to be combined and stacked, or have its points doubled (ダブル役満) if a secondary criteria for a limit hand is fulfilled. The hands known as Thirteen Orphans, Four Concealed Triplets, and Big Three Dragons are considered relatively easy to complete among limit hands, and are collectively called "the three big families of yakuman" (Japanese: 役満御三家). In general rules, a limit is valued at 13 han.

== List of yaku ==
The following is a list of all the hands, their names in English and Japanese, their han values, and any special conditions related to them. They are listed here in groups according to the underlying patterns that define the yaku. Example hands are given, but often, many other arrangements are possible for each yaku. All yaku can be divided into six basic categories, depending on the dominant feature itself. The names used here come from the World Riichi Championship ruleset, which is also used by the American Riichi Mahjong League, as well as most of its English version of media that use Japanese Mahjong, such as Mahjong Soul.

=== Special criteria ===
Name	Japanese	Han value	Closed/Open
Riichi / Ready	rīchi – 立直, リーチ ("ready")	1	Closed hand only
When a player's hand needs only one tile to win (tenpai) while the hand is closed (i.e. the player has not called any opponent's discards to make melds), the player can opt to declare riichi. This yaku is often called "reach" because its Japanese name is phonetically similar to the English word. To make a declaration, the player calls out “riichi”, discards their tile by placing it sideways, and places a 1,000-point stick on the table as a deposit. From then on, any tile they draw must be automatically discarded if it does not give them a winning hand. In this way, they cannot change the content of their hand in any way (except declaring certain closed quads).: Remaining tiles: In some rulesets, a player can make such declarations only when there are four or more tiles remaining in the wall. That is, the player cannot make such declaration if they could not draw another tile, thus the player is not penalized if drawing another tile is prevented due to opponents making open melds or closed quads after the declaration. If all four players have been declared ready, a hand ends as an abortive draw, and they must show their hands to confirm they are tenpai or are subjected to a chombo penalty.; Ura dora ("underneath dora"): When a player wins, any underneath dora indicator tiles are revealed. These are just like regular dora, but the indicator lies beneath the dora tile in the dead wall. The number of ura dora tiles to be revealed is based on how many dora tiles are open via kan calls.; Riichi deposits: The winner of a hand receives all 1,000-point riichi sticks that are present. In the case of multiple winners, the player closest to the discarding player (moving forward) receives all riichi deposits. If a hand ends in a draw, any riichi deposits carry over to the next game and are placed near the counters. The next winner receives those riichi deposits. In most cases, if a draw results in ending the game (such as exhaustive draws in the final round with the last dealer not ready to win, or exhaustive draws causing one or more players to reach a negative score), the game immediately ends while all riichi deposits are forfeited.; Claiming discards: When a player declares ready and discards a tile (sideways), an opponent may call that tile for a meld. The player who made this declaration on their next turn, places their next discard sideways. Additionally, should that discarded tile is called by another player to win, the declaration will not apply and thus the deposit will be retained by the current player.; Declaring closed quads: A player is allowed to call a closed quad (kan) after they have declared ready. This can only happen when they have a triplet in their hand and they draw the fourth tile, and while the quad is still displayed on the table, the quad must not otherwise change the composition of the hand or its waits. For example, when a player has, they can declare a closed quad when drawing the fourth. However, when they have waiting for, or, they cannot declare a quad when drawing, because and would no longer be winning tiles.
Nagashi mangan	nagashi mangan – 流し満貫	mangan	Can be opened
This hand is based on discarded tiles instead. A player's discards must be all terminals (1s and 9s) and honors (dragons/winds), and the hand must end in a draw (not including abortive draws). In most rules, the yaku only applies if no opponent called a discard from the player's discard pile. Certain rules allow the player to make open melds. In most cases, the value of this hand is mangan. When determining points, the hand is regarded as winning by self-draw. The rule of nō-ten bappu is usually not applied to this case, as it is no longer regarded as a draw. This hand cannot be combined with other hands. The World Riichi Championship as of 2025 and the European Mahjong Association as of 2016 do not include this hand in their rulesets.

=== Hands that contains no melds ===
These hands which lack melds do not comply to its standard four-meld-and-a-pair combination and can be won if the hand is completed, and as such, these hands must be closed.

Name	Japanese	Han value	Closed/Open
Seven Pairs	chītoitsu – 七対子, or chītoi – 七対	2	Closed hand only
🀉 🀙 🀝 🀐 🀗 🀀 🀄︎
A hand completely composed of pairs. This hand also has its own special rules for scoring, where it has fixed fu value of 25 (therefore Single Identical Sequences cannot be counted). In general Japanese rules, all seven pairs must be unique, meaning that the same four tiles may not be split into two pairs. Some rules, such as in the Kansai region, may accept four of the same tile, but they are not considered a quad.
Thirteen Orphans	kokushi musō / kokushi musō jūsanmen machi – 国士無双 / 国士無双13面待ち (13-way wait)	Limit (can double)	Closed hand only
(Single-tile wait)
(13-way wait)
This hand consist of one of each terminal and honor tile, and a duplicate of any of the 13 aforementioned tiles. The Japanese name of this hand, kokushi musō, means "a peerless distinguished person in a country." Other names for this yaku are shīsan yaochū (十三么九) which means "thirteen of smallest numbers and 9's [and honors]," or its abbreviation shīsan yao (十三么).: Double point criteria: a player acquires all the 13 tiles without drawing a duplicate of any tile, which forms a 13-way wait.

=== Hands based on luck ===
These hands usually rely on the player's luckiness, including those that won on very rare occasions, such as winning on the opening draw.

Name	Japanese	Han value	Closed/Open
Tsumo / Self-pick	menzenchin tsumohō – 門前清自摸和, or shortly tsumo – 自摸, ツモ	1	Closed hand only
A player wins by drawing a winning tile from the wall or the dead wall when the hand is closed.
Ippatsu / One-shot	ippatsu – 一発	1	Closed hand only
After declaring ready hand, one han is added if the player wins within one go-around of play (via an opponent's discard, or by a self-drawn tile); One-shot is nullified if the go-around is interrupted by another player calling a meld, including the player declaring closed quads.
Last Tile Draw / Under the Sea	haitei raoyue – 海底撈月, or haitei – 海底	1	Can be opened
A player wins when they draw the very last tile (not including the dead wall). The term haitei raoyue translates as "scooping up the reflection of the moon from the bottom of the sea."
Last Tile Claim / Under the River	hōtei raoyui – 河底撈魚, or houtei – 河底	1	Can be opened
A player wins when they call the very last tile, discarded by an opponent. Houtei raoyui is a pun on haitei raoyue (see previous yaku explanation). It means "catching fish from the bottom of the river."
Dead Wall Draw / After a Quad / After a Kan	rinshan kaihō – 嶺上開花, or rinshan – 嶺上	1	Can be opened
A player wins by drawing a supplemental tile from the dead wall, which is done after declaring a quad. Rinshan kaihō means "a flower blooms on a ridge". Sometimes the pao (包) rule is applied to this hand. If a player claims a discard to make an open quad and then completes their hand with a tile drawn from the dead wall, the hand is considered as a discard instead of self-drawn.
Robbing a Quad / Robbing a kan	chankan – 搶槓, 槍槓	1	Can be opened
A player wins when they call a tile that an opponent just used to declare a quad. Under sacred discards rule or furiten, any previously discarded tiles by that player used in that quad are not allowed to be robbed.: In most rulesets, a player cannot rob a closed quad, only an open one (i.e. after their opponent has "upgraded" an open triplet to a quad). Some rulesets permits robbing a closed quad if it's used to complete Thirteen Orphans (in this situation, a limit would be awarded instead of the hand).
Double Riichi / Double-ready	daburu rīchi – ダブルリーチ, or daburii – ダブリー	2	Closed hand only
A player declares ready on their first turn, and rules apply otherwise as a regular ready declaration.
Blessing of Heaven	tenhō – 天和	Limit	Closed hand only
A hand won by the dealer on the very first draw (which considered as a closed self-drawn tile), regardless of its contents.
Blessing of Earth	chīhō – 地和	Limit	Closed hand only
A hand won by any non-dealer on the first tile they draw (which fulfills the self-drawn tile hand), regardless of its contents, and without declaring any open-meld, including closed quads.
Blessing of Man	renhō – 人和	Depends on ruleset	Closed hand only
When a player has yet to have a turn, but they call an opponent's discard to win. It must also be the first called tile of the hand. Depending on the ruleset, this hand can be valued at either a yakuman, baiman, or mangan. In stricter rulesets, this is not considered a hand at all, and requires other hands to win. Some rulesets are laxer as the player can still achieve Blessing of Man after their first turn, if the tile they are calling was their opponent's first discard. Because of these variations, this hand is considered optional.

=== Hands based on sequences ===
These hands involve in sequences, with one set of tiles containing three numbered tiles in sequential order (applicable to non-honor tiles; 1-2-9 or 1-8-9 are not valid sequences)

Name	Japanese	Han value	Closed/Open
Pinfu / No-points hand	pinfu – 平和	1	Closed hand only
🀇 🀈 🀉 🀋 🀛 🀜 🀟 🀠 🀡 🀓 🀔 🀕 🀚
A hand that earns no fu points (which are calculated separately from han). While there are certain melds or a set that awards fu, the hand must be entirely made of sequences and its pair is neither a dragon tile, or winds tiles corresponding to the round or seating itself; any triplets, quads, or pairs of such award fu. Its hand must also be waiting for multiple winning tiles that does not form a pair. For example, such as having and thus waiting for or. All single-tile "waits" earn fu, namely an "inside wait" (e.g. waiting for a); an "edge wait" (e.g. waiting for a); or waiting to complete any pair.: Combination of no-point hand and self-draw: When the winning hand is a no-point hand, those 2 fu from a self-draw are normally waived. Such a hand allows both of these to be stacked. Some (uncommon) rulesets say that a no-points hand disallow self-drawing. In this case, 2 fu are awarded, and only 1 han. The rule is called "pinfu–tsumo nashi" (平和自摸無し or 平和ツモなし, pinfu–tsumo invalid), sometimes contracted to "pinzumo nashi" (ピンヅモなし). The opposite rule is called "pinfu–tsumo ari" (平和自摸有り or 平和ツモあり, pinfu–tsumo valid).; No-point hand when open:A hand that is open but satisfies the pinfu shape is awarded with 2 fu in-lieu of the yaku.; Comparison to other variants: This yaku is Japanese Mahjong's equivalent of the semi-common "All Sequences" scoring pattern, with extra restrictions to stop it from being a too dominant strategy - e.g. you cannot develop a hand in "either yakuhai or all sequences" shape to hedge against the third tile of a yakuhai pair never being discarded.
Single Identical Sequences	īpeikō – 一盃口	1	Closed hand only
🀈 🀊 🀝 🀞 🀟 🀘 🀅 🀉
Two sequences consisting of the same numbers, in the same suit. For example, the above hand has two copies of.
(Three) Mixed Sequences / Three Color Straight	sanshoku doujun – 三色同順, or sanshoku – 三色	2	−1 han if opened
🀈 🀉 🀊 🀙 🀚 🀛 🀜 🀑 🀒 🀓 🀁
A hand containing a sequence in each of the three suits. For example, the above hand has 2-3-4 in all three suits.
Full Straight	ikkitsuukan – 一気通貫, or ittsuu – 一通	2	−1 han if opened
🀏 🀑 🀒 🀓 🀔 🀕 🀖 🀗 🀘 🀆 🀐
A hand containing three single-suited sequences of 1-2-3, 4-5-6, and 7-8-9 (thus creating a full run from 1 to 9).
Double Identical Sequences	ryanpeikō – 二盃口	3	Closed hand only
🀌 🀍 🀎 🀚 🀛 🀜 🀀
Two independent sets of identical sequences. For example, the above hand has two copies of and two copies of. Due to the nature of the hand being sequences, this hand cannot be counted as Seven Pairs. Some rules may not allow the two sets to be the same, i.e. four identical sequences.

=== Hands based on triplets and/or quads ===
These hands involved triplets and quads if allowed; when a hand involve quads, triplets does not qualify.

Name	Japanese	Han value	Closed/Open
All Triplets	toitoihō – 対々和, or toitoi – 対々	2	Can be opened
🀎 🀛 🀐 🀖 🀃
The hand consists entirely of triplets (or quads) and no sequences. The hand can also be closed but only via a discarded tile.
Three Concealed Triplets	san'ankō – 三暗刻	2	Can be opened
🀇 🀊 🀙 🀚 🀛 🀡 🀑
A hand with at least three sets of triplets (or quads) formed via drawing without melding any. The fourth group can either be melded (i.e. formed by calling an opponent's discard), a sequence or open triplet. A closed quad can qualify as a concealed triplets/quad, despite being visible to the opponents.
(Three) Mixed Triplets	sanshoku doukō – 三色同刻	2	Can be opened
🀉 🀛 🀞 🀟 🀠 🀒 🀂
A hand containing three similarly numbered triplets in each of the three suits. For example, the above hand shows 3-3-3 in all three suits.
Three Quads / Three Kan	sankantsu – 三槓子	2	Can be opened
🀚 🀛 🀑 🀃 🀎 🀫 🀐 🀙
A hand consist of three quads (kan), either closed or open.
Four Concealed Triplets	sūankō – 四暗刻 / sūankō tankimachi - 四暗刻単騎待ち (single wait)	Limit (can double)	Closed hand only
(Double wait - must win via self-draw tile)
(Single wait)
A hand with four closed triplets/quads.: Double point criteria: a player is waiting for a single-tile to complete the pair, which is the only way where Four Concealed Triplets can be won via discards. A double waiting tile can only be won via self-pick.
Four Quads / Four Kan	sūkantsu – 四槓子	Limit	Can be opened
🀙 🀑 🀎 🀟 🀫 🀃
A hand consisting of four quads, either open or closed. The abortive draw of calling four quads (by multiple players) do not apply under normal rules. An abortive draw will continue to apply when a fifth quad is called.

=== Hands based on terminal or honor tiles ===
These hands involve terminals and/or honors tiles, or lack thereof (such as tan'yao and yakuhai, due to their simplicity).

Name	Japanese	Han value	Closed/Open
All Simples	tan'yaochū – 断么九, or tan'yao – 断么	1	Can be opened
🀈 🀉 🀊 🀚 🀞 🀟 🀠 🀔 🀕 🀖 🀗
A hand with only numbered tiles from 2 through 8, without any honor nor terminal tiles. If the hand is open, it is called "kuitan" (喰い断), which means tan'yao made by "eating" discards. In some rulesets, this hand can be closed only. The rule that does not allow kuitan is called "kuitan nashi" (喰い断無し; no kuitan, or kuitan invalid).
Honor Tiles	yakuhai – 役牌, or huanpai/fanpai – 飜牌	1 (per triplet)	Can be opened
🀋 🀙 🀚 🀛 🀝 🀞 🀟 🀗 🀄︎
Any triplet (or quad) consisting of dragons, the seat wind, or the round wind. A triplet matching both the Seat and Round Wind stacks together (such the East player in an East round with).
Common Ends	honchantai yaochū – 混全帯么九, or chanta – チャンタ	2	−1 han if opened
🀍 🀎 🀏 🀙 🀟 🀠 🀘 🀆 🀡
A hand where the pair and all of its sets include at least one terminal or honor tile, one of which must be a sequence (1-2-3 or 7-8-9).
Perfect Ends	junchantai yaochū – 純全帯么九, or junchan – 純チャン	3	−1 han if opened
🀇 🀈 🀉 🀏 🀡 🀐 🀑 🀖 🀗 🀘 🀒
A variant of Common Ends hand, where every set requires at least one terminal title with at least a sequence, but without honor tiles.
Common Terminals / All Terminals and Honors	honrōtō – 混老頭, or honrō – 混老	2	Can be opened
(All triplets)
(Seven pairs)
The hand consists entirely of terminals or honor tiles. This hand stacks with either All Triplets or Seven Pairs (examples shown above).
Little Three Dragons / Little Dragons	shōsangen – 小三元	2	Can be opened
🀚 🀛 🀜 🀕 🀖 🀗 🀆 🀅 🀄︎
A hand consisting of two triplets/quads of dragons, plus a pair of the third dragon. This hand stacks with two Honor tile triplets.
Big Three Dragons / Big Dragons	daisangen – 大三元	Limit	Can be opened
🀋 🀌 🀍 🀓 🀆 🀅 🀄︎
A variant of Little Three Dragons hand, comprising a triplet/quad of each type of dragon tile.
Little Four Winds / Little Winds	shōsūshī – 小四喜	Limit	Can be opened
🀕 🀖 🀗 🀀 🀁 🀂 🀃
A hand consisting of three triplets/quads of winds, plus a pair of the fourth wind. This hand is also called a four winds hand (sūshīhō - 四喜和).
Big Four Winds / Big Winds	daisūshī – 大四喜	Limit (or double)	Can be opened
🀛 🀀 🀁 🀂 🀃
A variant of Little Four Winds hand, comprising a triplet/quad of each type of wind tile. Depending on ruleset, this hand may allow a double of points if allowed.
All Honors	tsūīsō – 字一色	Limit	Can be opened
🀀 🀁 🀂 🀆 🀅
A hand composed exclusively of honor tiles.
All Terminals	chinrōtō – 清老頭	Limit	Can be opened
🀇 🀙 🀡 🀐 🀘
A hand composed exclusively of terminal tiles.

=== Hands based on suits ===
The following hands are related to a single suit; flushes can be stacked with Seven Pairs.

Name	Japanese	Han value	Closed/Open
Half Flush / Common Flush	hon'īsō – 混一色, or hon'itsu – 混一	3	−1 han if opened
🀙 🀛 🀜 🀟 🀠 🀡 🀁 🀆 🀝
A hand containing tiles from only one suit, plus honors of any kind.
Full Flush / Perfect Flush	chin'īsō – 清一色, or chin'itsu – 清一	6	−1 han if opened
🀐 🀒 🀓 🀔 🀕 🀖 🀗 🀘 🀑
A hand containing tiles from only one suit.
All Green	ryūīsō – 緑一色	Limit	Can be opened
🀑 🀒 🀓 🀕 🀗 🀅
A hand containing only pure-green tiles. Many of the Japanese tile-sets color these specific tiles with just green; however, four of nine bamboo tiles do not qualify for this hand regardless of the scheme due to the red-paint in it. This hand can also become a Full Flush, meaning that the green dragon tiles are not generally required.
Nine Gates	chūren pōtō – 九蓮宝燈 / junsei chūren pōtō - 純正九蓮宝燈 (9-way wait)	Limit (can double)	Closed hand only
(Normal wait)
(9-way wait)
A hand composed of 1-1-1-2-3-4-5-6-7-8-9-9-9 of one suit, with a duplicate of any one of the aforementioned tiles.: Double point criteria: a player acquires all the tiles such that it was arranged as 1-1-1-2-3-4-5-6-7-8-9-9-9, which forms a nine-way wait. Regardless of the value of the extra tile, this is always a standard mahjong hand of four-melds-one-pair hand, as shown in the animation below:

== Ancient or local yaku ==
The following table details yaku and yakuman hands that are usually not recognized as valid but may appear in house rules.

Name	Japanese	Value	Closed/Open
Three Chained Triplets	sanrenkō – 三連刻	2	Can be opened
🀉 🀊 🀋 🀑 🀒 🀓 🀄︎
A hand with three number triplets (or quads) in one suit with successive numbers. This hand is a local rule and not an officially recognized rule for Japanese mahjong.
Four Chained Triplets	sūrenkō – 四連刻	Limit	Can be opened
🀉 🀊 🀋 🀌 🀄︎
A hand with four number triplets (or quads) in one suit with successive numbers. This hand is a local rule and not an officially recognized rule for Japanese mahjong.
Chariot	Suit specific names (see below)	Limit	Closed hand only
🀚 🀛 🀜 🀝 🀞 🀟 🀠
A hand composed of 2-2-3-3-4-4-5-5-6-6-7-7-8-8 of one suit. This hand is a local rule and not an officially recognized rule for Japanese mahjong. Each of the numbered suits may also use special names for this hand: Pinzu (circles), daisharin – 大車輪 or big wheels Sōzu (bamboo), daichikurin – 大竹林 or bamboo forest Manzu (characters), daisūrin – 大数隣 or numerous neighbours
Big Seven Stars	daichishin – 大七星	Limit (or double)	Closed hand only
🀀 🀁 🀂 🀃 🀆 🀅 🀄︎
Seven pairs of honor tiles (dragons or winds). It is very unusual to play with rules that allow this.
Thirteen Unconnected Tiles	shīsanpūtā / shīsanbudō - 十三不塔	Limit	Closed hand only
🀈 🀌 🀙 🀜 🀠 🀑 🀕 🀘 🀀 🀁 🀆 🀄︎ 🀏
The hand contains thirteen tiles such that there are no groups, no pairs, and no number tiles closer than three apart from one another, plus an additional one of any of the tiles in the hand. Can only be claimed by a player on their first draw.
Fourteen Unconnected Tiles	shīsūpūtā - 十四不塔	Limit	Closed hand only
🀇 🀋 🀚 🀞 🀡 🀐 🀗 🀀 🀁 🀂 🀃 🀆 🀄︎ 🀅
The hand contains fourteen tiles so that there are no groups, no pairs, and no number tiles closer than three apart from one another. Can only be claimed by a player on their first draw.
Eight Consecutive Wins	pārenchan – 八連荘	Limit	Can be opened
A player wins eight times consecutively. The conditions of the hand depend on rules, which can be triggered by achieving either the ninth consecutive win onwards, or per every eight wins. It has nothing to do with the number of counters because the number increases when a hand is a draw. In some rules, no other yaku is necessary in the eighth winning. Some rules require the player to be a dealer from the first time. The player is always a dealer when the hand is accomplished. The hand is often optional.

== See also ==
- Mahjong
- Japanese mahjong scoring rules
- List of poker hands
