= Japanese mahjong =

Variation of mahjong

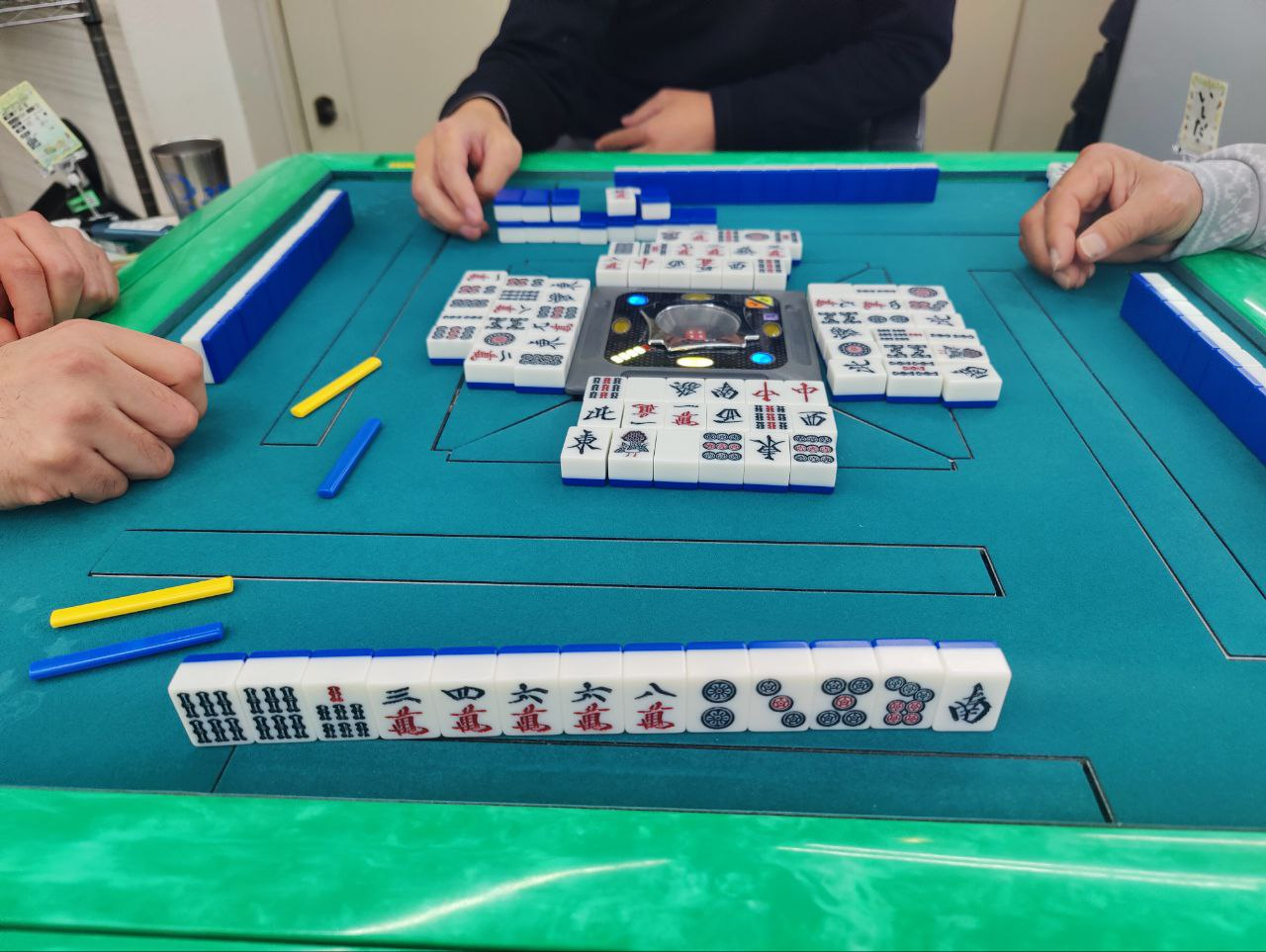
In Japanese mahjong, each player arranges their discards in an ordered, openly readable pile. One may not win by stealing a tile (ron) if they had previously discarded a winning tile (furiten).

Japanese mahjong (Japanese: 麻雀, Hepburn: Mājan), also known as riichi mahjong (リーチ麻雀, rīchi mājan), is a variant of mahjong. Japanese mahjong shares the same basic rules as other mahjong variants, but also features a unique set of rules such as riichi (a wager that one's hand will win without being altered further) and the use of dora (randomly selected tiles that will score bonus points). The variant is one of a few styles where discarded tiles are ordered rather than placed in a disorganized pile. This is primarily due to the furiten rule, which takes player discards into account. The variant has grown in popularity due to anime, manga, and online platforms.

== History ==
In 1909, Nagawa Higosaku brought a Mahjong set to Japan. This is the earliest documented Mahjong set in Japan. Mahjong gained popularity in the following years, with the ealiest known club being Jakusenkai, established in 1920 in Akasaka, Tokyo, although other clubs likely existed at the time.

In the 1920s, Mahjong play started to become organized, but a large number of varying rulesets existed. Early Japanese Mahjong players had experience with a diverse set of existing rulesets, from various parts of China as well as from western Mahjong rules. Standardization proved difficult; and still today, there is no single standard Riichi Mahjong ruleset.

Mahjong, as of 2010, is the most popular table game in Japan. As of 2008, there were approximately 7.6 million mahjong players and about 8,900 mahjong parlors in the country, and it was estimated that parlors made over 300 billion yen in sales that year. There are several manga and anime devoted to dramatic and comic situations involving mahjong (see Media), as well as video games.

In Japan, there are what are known as professional players, usually members of organizations that compete in internal leagues and external events with other professionals and the general public. There are over 2,400 professionals spread across a half-dozen organizations. There is no universal authority for riichi mahjong in Japan: professionals cannot dictate how mahjong parlors or amateur organizations and players operate. There are therefore many small differences in the rules, and each mahjong parlor and league defines their own rules. Likewise, there is no global authority regulating riichi mahjong. Since 2018, there exists a league of select professionals (coming from the other professional mahjong organizations) run by Abema named M.League which presents mahjong as a professional sport. Teams of professionals receive salary as players, compete in ranking and playoffs as teams, and wear team jerseys to enhance the image of mahjong as a sport.

== Tiles ==
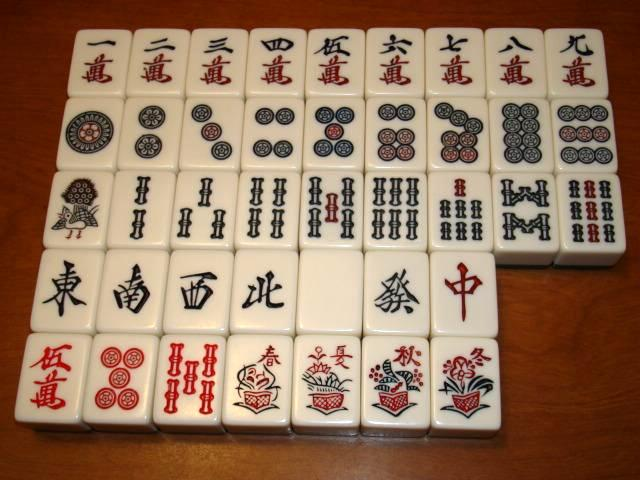
Japanese mahjong tiles, including red dora tiles as well as season tiles which are used in variants

Japanese mahjong is usually played with 136 tiles. The tiles are mixed and then arranged into four walls that are each two stacked tiles high and 17 tiles wide. 26 of the stacks are used to build the players' starting hands, 7 stacks are used to form a dead wall, and the remaining 35 stacks form the live wall from which tiles are drawn.

There are 34 different kinds of tiles, with four of each kind. Just like standard mahjong, there are three suits of tiles, pin (circles), sō (bamboo) and wan (characters), and unranked honor tiles (字牌, jihai). Honor tiles are further divided between wind tiles and dragon tiles. Some rules may have red number five tiles which work as dora that earn more han value. The flower and season tiles are omitted. Names for suit tiles follow the pattern of [number] + [suit], the numbers being Japanese interpretations of the corresponding Chinese words.

Collectively, the circle, bamboo and character tiles are referred to as shūpai (数牌). Among them, the 1s and 9s are called rōtōhai (老頭牌; or "terminals" in English), while the rest (2s through 8s) are the chunchanpai (中張牌). Together, the honor and terminal tiles make up the yaochūpai (么九牌).

=== Pin (筒子, pinzu) ===
Named as each tile consists of a number of circles.

īpin	ryanpin	sanpin	sūpin	ūpin	rōpin	chīpin	pāpin	chūpin

=== Sō (索子, sōzu) ===
Named as each tile consists of a number of bamboo sticks (also interpreted as strings) that hold a hundred coins each. The face of the number one tiles is a peafowl.

īsō	ryansō	sansō	sūsō	ūsō	rōsō	chīsō	pāsō	chūsō

=== Man (萬子, wanzu; or manzu) ===
Named as each tile consists of a number of ten thousands (萬, wan, or man; see the lower character on the tile). Originally, this was 10,000 coins made up of 100 strings of 100 coins each (see mahjong tiles). The kanji of number five usually becomes 伍 instead of 五. The modern Japanese standard uses wan as the suit's suffix, most western languages including English will use man instead to avoid confusion with "one". The seven in this suit would thus be called chīwan in Japanese, but seven-man (or 7-man) in English.

īwan	ryanwan	sanwan	sūwan	ūwan	rōwan	chīwan	pāwan	chūwan

=== Wind tiles (風牌, kazehai; or fonpai) ===
Named after the four cardinal directions.

ton (East)	nan (South)	shā (West)	pē (North)

=== Dragon tiles (三元牌, sangenpai; "three elements tiles") ===
White (白, haku), Green (發, hatsu), and Red (中, chun). Often, the face of the White dragon tiles is blank white. The kanji of the Green dragon tiles in Japan is usually 𤼵 which is slightly different from 發 since it includes 矢 instead of 殳.

haku	hatsu	chun

== General mahjong rules ==
Many basic rules of mahjong apply to the Japanese variation. Valid collections of three tiles are called groups (mentsu), divided into triplets (kōtsu) and sequences (shuntsu). Players can also form a quad (kantsu) using four of the same tile.

=== Making groups by calling (melding) ===
Players can make a meld (open group) by calling for another player's discard. They reveal the meld on the table and then make their own discard. Calling for another player's discard makes the group and the hand open. When a winning tile of a closed hand is a discard, the group including that discard is also considered open, while the hand is still regarded as closed. The calls operate exactly the same as any variation of mahjong, except Japanese terminology is used.

==== Chii ====
Players can make an open sequential group, a sequence (three consecutive tiles in the same suit), by calling out "chii" (チー or 吃) using a tile discarded by the player to their left. Players place the meld face up on the table, usually on the right side of their hands, with the discard placed sideways at the leftmost position of the meld to indicate which tile was taken from the left player's discard pile.

==== Pon ====
Players can make an open identical group, a triplet (three identical tiles in the same suit or honor tiles) by calling out "pon" (ポン or 碰) using a tile discarded by any other player. Players place the meld face up on the table with one of those tiles placed sideways to indicate from whom the discard was taken.

==== Kan ====
Players can make a meld from four identical tiles in the same suit or four identical honor tiles. After calling a quad, the next adjacent dora indicator tile is flipped, and players need to draw a supplemental tile from the end of the dead wall. Depending on the rules, the number of tiles in the dead wall is kept at 14 by reserving the last available tile from the wall, or the number decreases at that time. There are three types of quads. Players call out "kan" (カン or 槓) for all of them.

- Closed quad (Ankan or 暗槓): Players can make a closed quad if they have four of the same tile in their hand. They reveal those tiles, then place them to the right side of their hand with two tiles face up and two face down. They then draw another tile from the dead wall. A closed quad does not use another player's discard and does not open their hand.
- Open quad (Daiminkan or 大明槓): Players can make an open quad using another player's discarded tile if they have three of that same tile in their hand. They reveal the meld on the table with all four tiles face up, with one placed sideways to indicate from whom the discard was taken. Players cannot make this type of quad using an open meld of three tiles.
- Added open quad (Shouminkan or 小明槓): Players can make an added open quad (加槓, kakan) by adding a self-drawn tile or a tile already in their hand to an open meld of the same three tiles. The tile is usually added sideways on top of the sideways tile in the open meld.

==== Precedence order ====
The order of precedence to pick up a discard when two or more players want it is ron (winning via a discard tile) first, kan or pon second, and chii third. Kan and pon cannot happen at the same time since there are only four of each tile. Depending on the ruleset being used, these calls may be allowed when the next player has already drawn and seen their next tile. In such cases, that player takes first precedence if they call tsumo (winning via self-drawing a tile).

== Japanese rules overview ==
While the basic rules to mahjong apply with the Japanese variation, an additional, distinct set of rules are applied.

=== Yaku and yakuman ===
Hand types, or yaku, are specific combinations of tiles or conditions that yield the value of hands. Unlike many variants, a winning hand must have at least one yaku. When scoring, each yaku has its own han value, with every han approximately doubling the value of a hand up to a limit.

A yakuman is a rare yaku with stringent criteria which automatically scores the maximum number of points, ignoring any other scoring patterns. In some variations, multiple yakuman can be scored at the same time.

=== Riichi ===
Declaring riichi means declaring a ready hand, and is a kind of yaku. A player may declare a ready hand if their hand needs only one tile to complete a legal hand (tenpai), and the player has not claimed another players' discards to make open melds. When declaring riichi, the player must place their 1,000-point stick and place their discarded tile sideways; the hand is then fixed and may not be changed except when forming certain closed quads. After declaring a ready hand, a player can win on any drawn or discarded tile even if their hand has no other yaku.

As a possible house rule, a player can choose to reveal their hand when declaring riichi to win more points if successful, which is called open riichi (オープン立直, ōpun rīchi). In that case, the player shows only the tiles that are related to waits, or reveals all the tiles in the hand depending on the rules. The declaration increases the han count allowing the player to score extra points.

=== Dora ===
Dora (ドラ) are bonus tiles that add han value to a winning hand. Every kind of tile can become a bonus tile, allowing its han value to increment based on the amount of its corresponding "indicator" tiles. Bonus tiles are not counted as yaku, regardless of the number of tiles present; the player still must form a yaku in order to count.

At the start of a hand, the upper tile from the third stack from the back end of the dead wall is flipped and becomes a bonus tile indicator. A tile of a next succeeding number or color is the bonus tile. For example, if an indicator is a Green dragon, Red dragons are counted as a bonus tile by the sequence shown below, in which the Red dragon wraps around to the White dragon.

The succeeding order of bonus tile is as follows:

→→→→→→→→→

→→→→→→→→→

→→→→→→→→→

→→→→

→→→

The number of bonus tile indicators increases in the following manner: each time a player calls a quad, the next adjacent bonus indicator tile is flipped, starting with the upper tile from the fourth stack from the back end. The indicator is flipped immediately after the quad is called, and after that the player draws a supplemental tile for their hand from the back end of the dead wall. The number of indicators increases in that direction, which becomes five if a single player calls four quads, and that is the largest possible number from the upper tiles in the third to seventh stacks of the dead wall (see four quads).

Additional bonus points can be awarded in the following situations:

- Hidden bonus tiles (裏ドラ, uradora): when a player wins with a ready hand declaration, the tiles underneath the bonus tile indicators become additional bonus tile indicators as well.
- Red 5 tiles (赤ドラ, akadora): a variation uses specially marked red number 5 tiles that are also bonus tiles, regardless of whether it is indicated or not. The red 5 tiles also stack with normal bonus tiles if the indicator tile displays a 4. One red 5 tile for each suit is usually used in place of regular five tiles, with some local variants using various amounts (two 5-pin only, two 5-pin and one 5-sō and 5-wan, two of each 5 in all three suits, et cetera). In some variations, tiles of other numbers such as 3 or 7 can be marked red.

=== Scoring system ===
Among the modern mahjong variants, the Japanese scoring system is unique. Two variables are considered: the han value and fu value. A winning hand acquires points based on these values, which correspond to a points-value table. Fu counting is unnecessary if the hand contains at least five han.

=== Winning ===
A player winning a hand via another player's discard calls out "ron" (ロン or 栄, picking up a discard). The opponent who discarded the winning tile must pay the full value of the hand to the winner.

A player winning with a self-drawn tile declares "tsumo" (ツモ or 自摸). In this case all three opponents split the payment to the winner. Based on the scoring table, the number of points paid depends on which player is the dealer. If the winner is the dealer, the value of the hand is 1.5 times greater than normal, and the other players split the payment equally. If the winner is a non-dealer, the dealer contributes half the value of the hand, while the non-dealer opponents each contribute a quarter.

=== Arranged discards ===
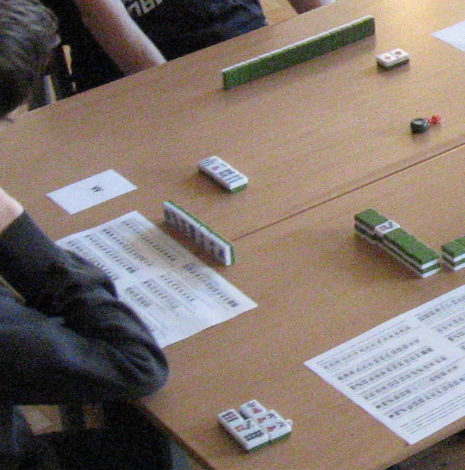
The called tile in open groups is pointed towards the player it was called from. In this case, both calls came from the player to the left, whose discard pile is accordingly smaller by the two tiles taken.

In many mahjong variants, discards are simply placed in the middle of the table in a disorganized fashion. However, in the Japanese variant, tiles are neatly placed in order of discard in front of each player. Customarily, discards are placed in rows of 6 tiles. In addition, open calls for chii, pon, and kan have discard specific rules, by which they must indicate the source and type of discarded tile. This way, a record is maintained of all discarded tiles corresponding to each player. Proper game strategy takes into account the state of the discards in addition to the players' hands.

=== Furiten ===
There are three situations in which a win using another player's discard is forbidden. In such cases, the player is said to be in a state of furiten (振聴):

1. A player cannot win on any discard if any of their potential winning tiles are present in their discard pile. This includes tiles that have been called by other players for open melds.
2. If a potential winning tile is discarded and the player does not call it to win, that player cannot win on any discard after it until their next turn. This is known as "temporary furiten". Generally, other players making open melds does not end temporary furiten.
3. Temporary furiten becomes permanent after riichi; if a player passes on any chance to win a hand (either passes on a winning discard, or discard a drawn winning tile) after declaring riichi, that player can no longer win on any discard.

For the purposes of furiten, potential winning tiles include any tile which would complete the hand, even if the player could not actually win with that tile due to the resulting hand having no yaku.

=== Abortive draws ===
In certain rulesets of Japanese mahjong, abortive draws may be declared while tiles are still available. They can be declared under the following conditions:

- Nine different terminal and honor tiles (九種九牌, Kyūshu kyūhai), shortened from kyūshu yaochūhai tōhai (九種么九牌倒牌): On a player's first turn when no meld has been called, if a player has nine different terminal or honor tiles, the player may declare the hand to be drawn. For example, the hand may be. Instead of declaring a draw, the player could choose to go for the thirteen orphans (kokushi musō) hand.
- Four winds barrier (四風子連打, Sūfontsu rendā): On the first turn without any meld calls, the hand is immediately drawn when all four players discard the same wind tile.
- Four players ready (四家立直, Sūcha riichi), or Yonin riichi (四人立直): If all four players declare a ready hand, the hand is drawn after the last player discards without dealing in.
- Four quads abort (四槓散了, Sūkan sanra): The hand is drawn when a winning hand cannot be made from the discard after the fourth quad is called, unless all the four quads were called by a single player. If the four quads were collectively called by two or more players, the game may end upon the last player to make a quad discarding (either safely or dealing in), or it may end immediately. If all four quads were called by a single player, the hand continues. Once four quads have been made and the game is allowed to continue, generally, a fifth quad is unable to be formed. Like most optional settings, it is possible that a local mechanism is in place to allow for further quads, but is very rare.

=== Chombo ===
Players may be penalized under the following circumstances:

- Gotsumo (誤ツモ) and goron (誤ロン): calling respectively tsumo or ron with an invalid hand
- Declaring a closed kan after riichi if the kan changes the wait or the structure of the player's hand.
- Furiten ron: calling ron while furiten
- Nōten riichi (ノーテンリーチ): calling riichi while not in tenpai
- Tāhai (多牌) and shōhai (少牌): having more or fewer tiles than allowed (depending on the rules)
- Yamakuzure (山崩れ; lit. "landslide"): damaging the wall to the point that it cannot be recovered

== Game ending conditions ==
A game ends after the last hand of the last round, which is usually the South round.

=== Bankruptcy ===
A game ends when a player's score becomes negative (below zero), or in some rare local rules, at zero points or less. Some rules may allow continued gameplay with a player having a negative point value.

=== Runaway victory ===
Some rule sets allow for the last dealer to decide whether to continue playing extra hands in the final round or stop. A runaway victory (あがりやめ, agari yame; "win and stop") is when the last dealer decides to exercise this option after winning a hand, for instance when they are the top player at the time. In some cases, a stop may be allowed simply for playing a hand and ending with a ready hand tenpai yame (聴牌やめ), or in very rare cases, allow the last dealer to end the game regardless of position.

=== Continuing into West ===
If the score of the top player is less than 30,000 points after the last hand of the last round, the game continues into the West round (西場, shāba) in some rules. This situation is called shānyū (西入; "entering West"). The prevailing wind becomes West. A North round (北場, pēba) may come next in the same way. Depending on the rules, it can be followed by an East round again or instead White dragon, Green dragon, Red dragon and East rounds. Any extra round ends as soon as one player has 30,000 points or more.

=== Settling the score ===
At the end of a match, players are often given bonus points or penalties depending on their placement (see final points and place).

== Yakitori ==
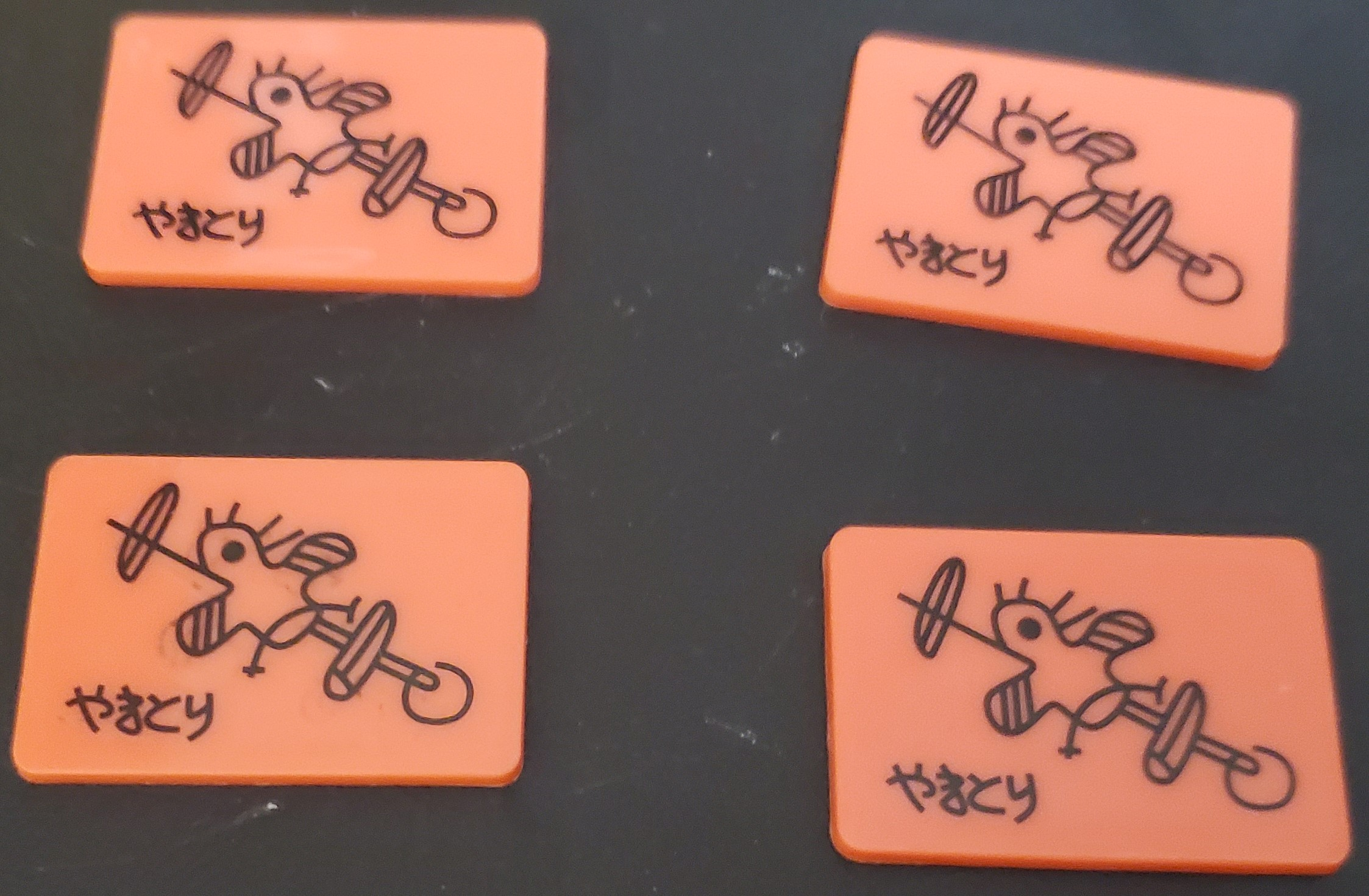
Yakitori markers

In an optional rule called yakitori (焼き鳥, "grilled bird"), if one did not win a hand in a match, that player pays a penalty. At the start of a match, each player has a marker called yakitori māku (mark) (焼き鳥マーク, "grilled bird mark") on the table, and a player flips their own after winning a hand. Chips or coins are also used as substitutes, and they are often removed instead of being flipped.

== Shūgi ==
Often in mahjong parlors across Japan, an additional bonus payment called shūgi (祝儀) is given to players who won their hand. For each shūgi the winning hand has, additional payments are made by either the player who threw the winning tile, or by each player in the case of a self-draw. Common shūgi are:

- Limit value hands (yakuman 役満)
- One-shot (ippatsu 一発)
- Red fives (or other extra red tiles) dora (aka-dora 赤ドラ)
- Ura-dora (裏ドラ)

== Theory ==
Japanese mahjong has an extensively developed theory. Japanese mahjong is reliant on both skill and luck, so strategy focuses on gaining probabilistic and strategical advantages.

Japanese mahjong is a comparative point game. Unlike betting variations of mahjong, decisions are made compared to other players instead of a strict expected value basis. As mahjong is a game dependent on psychology and game theory, experienced players may deviate from optimal decision-making in order to bluff or mislead opponents.

=== Tile acceptance ===
In Japanese mahjong the first player to complete their hand wins the round. As a result, it is typically advantageous for players to reach a complete hand as fast as possible.

Tile efficiency, also known as tile acceptance theory, is a concept to estimate which tile is best to discard. The goal is to move to a completed hand as fast as possible, aided by maximizing the number of available tiles that improve the hand.

Discards should aim to reduce the shanten (向聴) of the hand, the number of tiles required to reach a ready hand (tenpai). As a consequence, discards should also aim to increase the ukeire (受け入れ) of the hand, the number of tiles that can be drawn to reduce shanten.

=== Defense ===
Unlike some other mahjong variants, in Japanese Mahjong the player who deals in pays the full point value of the winning player's hand. Defense revolves around avoiding dealing into a player with a tenpai hand.

The furiten rules can be used to identify safe tiles known as genbutsu (現物). Both the contents and order of tiles in a player's discard pile can be further used to identify tiles that are either statistically unlikely or impossible to be one of their winning tiles.

=== Push-fold ===
Push-fold decisions revolve around using tile acceptance and defensive information to weigh whether a player should pursue a winning hand at the risk of dealing in, against abandoning completing their hand in order to discard the tiles least likely to deal in.

Push-fold lies on a spectrum of decisions including betaori (ベタ降り), the complete abandonment of winning in order to avoid dealing in to a tenpai player; zentsuppa (全ツッパ), conversely aiming to complete one's hand without regard to the risk their discarded tiles may pose; and mawashi (回し打ち), stepping back in shanten to avoid dealing in while still leaving open the opportunity to win the hand.

== Related versions ==
There is a three player version called sanma (三麻), which eliminates all but the 1 and 9 tiles from the manzu suit, and removes the ability to call "chii". There is a version for two players called "San Hako Mahjong" that keeps all tiles, permits calling "chii", and utilizes a dummy player.

== Media ==
Japanese mahjong is featured in anime and manga series such as Akagi, which has also been made into a live action television series, The Legend of the Gambler: Tetsuya, Saki and Mudazumo Naki Kaikaku. A live action series named Shin Janki (真・雀鬼) features the game involving yakuza and gambling, while employing various cheating tactics and techniques.

In the 2009 anime drama Detective Conan: The Raven Chaser, the plot revolves around a serial killer who leaves mahjong tiles next to the bodies of his victims (the one of circles tile next to the body of the first victim and the tiles of the seven of circles next to the bodies of the other six victims)

== Video games ==
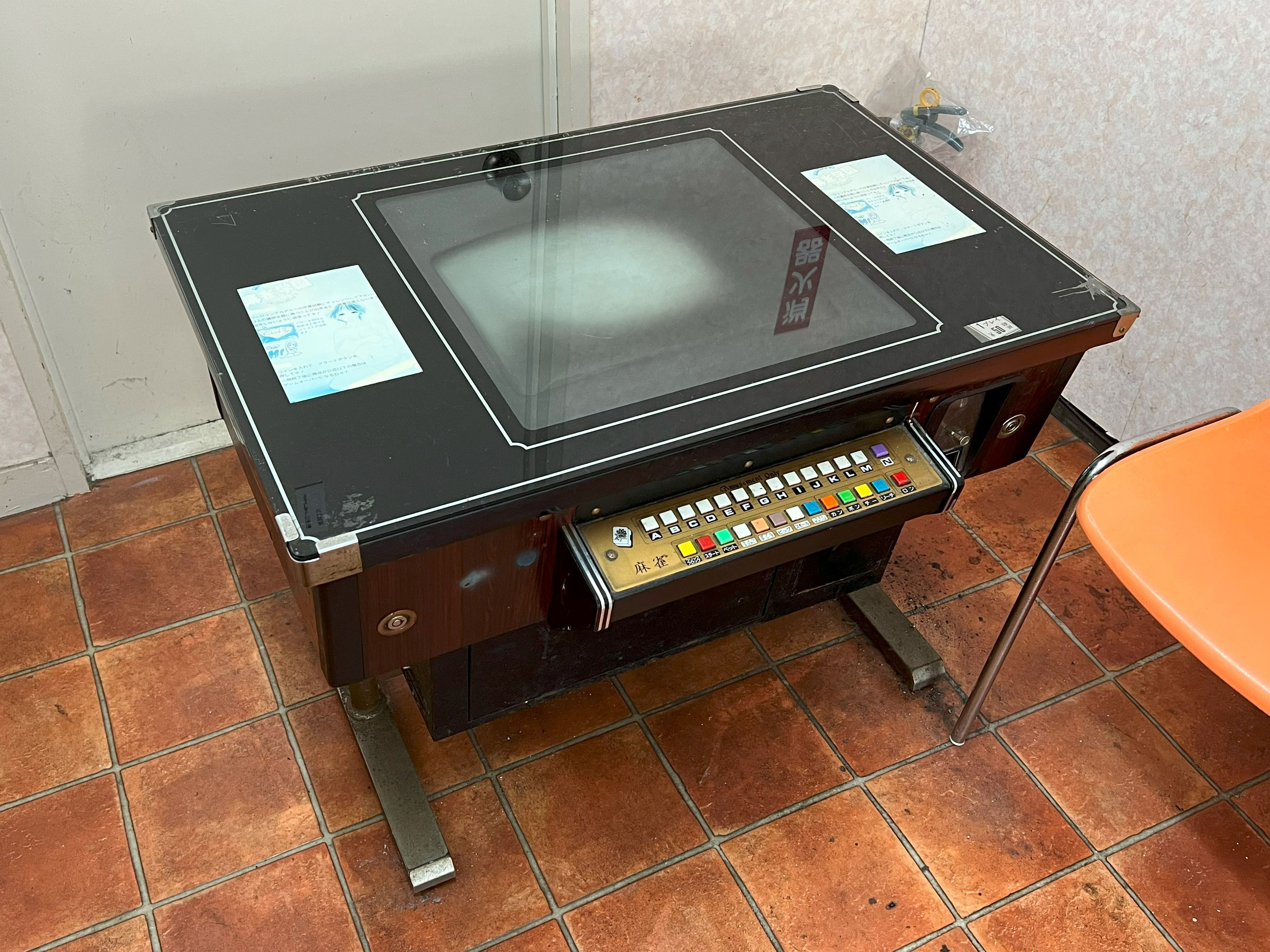
A mahjong arcade game in a cocktail cabinet.

The first arcade mahjong video game Janputer (ジャンピューター) was released in Japan in 1981 by Alpha Denshi; it introduced a number of conventions that persisted into later entries in the genre, such as a horizontal control scheme with buttons assigned to the tiles (labeled alphabetically) and calls.

In 1983, Nichibutsu popularized strip mahjong (Japanese: 脱衣麻雀, Hepburn: datsui mājan) or video mahjong games, a type of eroge game which rewards victories by showing cutscenes featuring characters (via either sprites, or digitized images of live-action models) in states of undress. Strip mahjong games generally feature a two-player adaptation of Richi mahjong played against computer-controlled opponents, with some games also allowing players to earn power-ups to "cheat" in matches. Alongside Nichibatsu's games were competitors such as SETA and Taito's Super Real Mahjong, and doujin games such as Majaventure for the PC-88; games such as Super Real Mahjong would utilize anime cutscenes and voice acting, while Nichibatsu games would later use FMVs of adult video actors.

Mahjong Academy (麻雀学園)—which was developed by the Capcom imprint Yuuga under director Yoshiki Okamoto—notably included a feature that allowed players to interact with the cutscenes by pressing the "H" button, which spawned floating hands that fondled or stroked the character's body parts. Mahjong Academy became one of Japan's highest-grossing arcade games of 1988, and helped Capcom avert a financial crisis. The proliferation of strip and video mahjong games with sexually explicit content led to concerns from the National Police Agency, as they were available in public arcades that could be readily accessible to minors. In the 1990s, evolving content standards led to a larger emphasis on releases for home computers and video game consoles rather than arcades, including Jantei Story, Idol Janshi Suchie-Pai, and Taisen Hot Gimmick. In 2026, current rightsholder Illumination released a new PC VR-oriented entry in the Super Real Mahjong franchise—Super Real Mahjong Venus Returns—after a successful crowdfunding campaign in 2025. Due to the campaign significantly surpassing its original target, the game's release was delayed to add additional features that were not originally planned, such as full voice acting.

Most current mahjong video games place a larger focus on competitive play (including local and online multiplayer), such as Konami's Mahjong Fight Club franchise, and Mahjong Soul. Mahjong has also been included as a minigame in other Japanese video game franchises, such as the Yakuza series (taking place at in-world parlours), and Final Fantasy XIV (which has featured a variant of Richi known as "Doman Mahjong" as a multiplayer minigame; in 2026, the game and publisher Square Enix became a corporate sponsor of Japan's Saikouisen Nihon Pro Mahjong league).

== Global community ==
Outside Japan, there are clubs sporadically located across Europe, North America, Asia and South America. There are also tournaments of various sizes, the largest outside of Japan being the World Riichi Championship. Smaller events, such as the European Riichi Championship, as well as a few other tournaments can have attendance numbers of tens of people, sometimes even over 100 at events like the European Riichi Championship, and as high as 224 at the World Riichi Championship (2017 Las Vegas edition). The total reach extends to almost 50 countries, but some countries may have few players, others may have hundreds or thousands.

== See also ==
- World Riichi Championship
- European Mahjong Association
