= Mahjong Soul =

2018 video game

雀魂(じゃんたま) (Jantama)
- Genre: Sports (mahjong)
- Video game
- Developer: Cat Food Studio
- Publisher: Cat Food Studio (China); Yostar (worldwide)
- Genre: Tabletop game
- Platform: Browser, Android, iOS, Windows
- Released: CHN: June 2018; WW: April 2019
- Anime television series

Mahjong Soul Pong
- Directed by: Kenshirō Morii
- Written by: Kenshirō Morii
- Music by: Shintarō Mori
- Studio: Scooter Films
- Licensed by: Crunchyroll
- Original network: MBS, TBS
- Original run: April 2, 2022 – June 18, 2022
- Episodes: 12
- Original net animation

Mahjong Soul Kan!!
- Directed by: Kazuomi Koga
- Written by: Kazuomi Koga
- Music by: Ayumi Kurokawa; Hinako Tsubakiyama
- Studio: Alke
- Released: April 25, 2024 – July 18, 2024
- Episodes: 13

Mahjong Soul (Chinese: 雀魂麻将; pinyin: Què Hún Májiàng, Japanese: 雀魂(じゃんたま), romanized: Jantama) is a browser-based online free-to-play version of tabletop game riichi mahjong created by Cat Food Studio and Yostar. It was released in June 2018 in China and in April 2019 for English and Korean-speaking players, as well as for Android and iOS devices. An anime television series adaptation by Scooter Films titled Mahjong Soul Pong (じゃんたま PONG☆, Jantama Pong☆) aired from April to June 2022 on the Super Animeism block. An original net animation sequel by Alke titled Mahjong Soul Kan!! aired from April to July 2024.

== Media ==
=== Game ===
In 2018, Mahjong Soul first launched in China (CN server). The following year in April, the game platform opened up for English players (EN server) as well as a server for Korean players (KR server). A service for Japanese players (JP server) opened up later in the summer.

==== Official Tournaments ====
The first tournament held in the EN server was the Catfood Bowl Tournament – Season 0 in 2019. Since then, Mahjong Soul has regularly held two yearly tournaments, the Catfood Bowl – Minor and Catfood Bowl – Major. For several years, there was also a team based tournament, Team Championship, but this tournament has not been held since 2021. Mahjong Soul has also held irregular tournaments as promotion for events done in collaboration with anime series. In 2025, two were held; Battle of the Four Winds, a collaboration with a Fate/stay night movie, and JongTama Open Championship, a collaboration with the Gintama series. In 2026, the collaboration tournaments were Aincrad MahjongSoul Online, a collaboration with the Sword Art Online series, and the Zawa Zawa Cup, a collaboration with the Akagi series.

=== Anime ===
An anime television series adaptation of the game was announced at the live-streamed "Nijisanji Mahjong Cup" tournament on January 9, 2022. The series is animated by Scooter Films, with Kenshirō Morii directing and writing the series, Motoki Nakanishi as assistant director, and Sōshi Kinutani designing the characters. Takatoshi Hamano directed the sound, and Shintarō Mori composed the music. It aired from April 2 to June 18, 2022, on the Super Animeism block. Crunchyroll has licensed the series.

An original net animation sequel titled Mahjong Soul Kan!! was announced on January 6, 2024. It produced by Alke and directed and written by Kazuomi Koga, with Ayumi Kurokawa and Hinako Tsubakiyama composing the music. It aired from April 25 to July 18, 2024, on YouTube Premium.
