= World Riichi Championship =

Worldwide Japanese Mahjong competition

The World Riichi Championship (WRC) is a worldwide competition of Japanese Mahjong (also known as Riichi Mahjong) held every 3 years since 2014. The competition is open to all ages and genders. Participants generally consist of Japanese professional Mahjong players and foreign amateur players selected by national organizations from Europe, North America, and elsewhere around the world.

== History ==
The first edition of WRC was organized by two brothers, Quentin and Valérian Thomas, founders of Tri Nitro Tiles (TNT), a French Riichi Mahjong Club in 2014.

On July 16–20, 2014, the 1st Championship was held in the Mairie de Puteaux (city hall), in the Paris, France region.

The second edition was organized by the United States Professional Mahjong League (USPML) in 2017. On October 4–8, 2017, the WRC was held at the Palms Casino Resort in Las Vegas, Nevada, USA.

The third edition was hosted in Vienna, Austria. The original date was in 2020, but concerns over the coronavirus pandemic prompted planners to postpone the event. The third edition was finally held at the InterContinental Vienna in Vienna, Austria on August 25-28, 2022.

The fourth edition was held at Nihombashi Mitsui Hall in Chuo, Tokyo, Japan on July 1-6, 2025, organized by the Japan Professional Mahjong League (JPML), and specially sponsored by Earth Corporation as part of the business for its 100th anniversary. A team event was introduced in this edition.

The fifth edition will be held in New York City in 2028.

== Qualification ==
General qualification varies by country and association. Players from various nations refer to their national organization for qualification.

== List of World Riichi Championships ==
=== Main event ===
Year	Host country	Host city	Organizer	Winner	Runner-up	Third place	Countries	Participants	Ref.
2014	France	Puteaux	Tri Nitro Tiles (TNT)	Hiroshi Yamai (JPN)	Kazuhiko Nishijima (JPN)	Jun Nishikawa (JPN)	23	120	
2017	United States	Las Vegas	United States Professional Mahjong League (USPML)	Masaharu Tomotake (JPN)	Ryūichi Masuda (JPN)	Hiroyuki Yamada (JPN)	25	224	
2022	Austria	Vienna	Kasu	Keijun Nara (JPN)	Satoshi Fujisaki (JPN)	Valentin Courtois (FRA)	34	152	
2025	Japan	Tokyo	Japan Professional Mahjong League (JPML)	Kotaro Uchikawa (JPN)	Masaharu Tomotake (JPN)	Junseok Yoon (KOR)	38	256	
2028	United States	New York City	TBA						

=== Team event ===
Year	Host country	Host city	Organizer	Winner	Runner-up	Third place	Teams	Ref.
2025	Japan	Tokyo	Japan Professional Mahjong League (JPML)	Portugal/Spain	China B	Japan Full National Team B	45	
2028	United States	New York City	TBA					

== See also ==
- European Riichi Championship
- European Mahjong Association (EMA)
