= Japanese mahjong scoring rules =

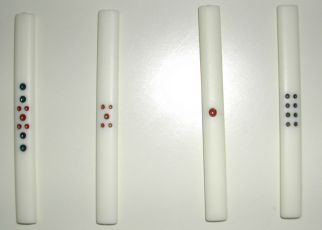
Japanese point sticks, used in a manner similar to poker chips. Left to right: 10,000 point stick, 5,000 point stick, 1,000 point stick, 100 point stick

Japanese mahjong scoring rules are used for Japanese mahjong, a game for four players common in Japan. The rules were organized in the Taishō to Shōwa periods as the game became popular.

The scoring system uses structural criteria as well as bonuses. Player start scores may be set to any value. Usually, it is set to 20,000 to 30,000 points. Scores are counted using sticks of 10,000 points, 5,000 points, 1,000 points and 100 points. A game often ends when a player's score drops below zero, or (almost exclusively online rulesets use this) at zero or less, which is a situation called hakoten, (Note: Literally "(empty) box points." Japanese mahjong sets often have four boxes to store tiles, and they are often used for point sticks. (Japanese: ハコテン)) dobon, (Note: Sound of something heavy like a stone falling into water. (Japanese: ドボン)) buttobi, (Note: (Japanese: ぶっとび)) etc. However, some settings allow the game to continue, even if a player's score dropped below zero.

There are two criteria for determining the winning points: han and fu, which correspond to a points table. Han is the unit for the value of yaku, which are particular patterns or conditions of a hand, as well as dora, which are tiles given bonus points for the round or as marked on the tile (red fives). Fu is the value of melds, waits and "going out". Hands with enough fu and/or han may be considered limit hands; limit hands use predefined values to determine the winning points. A rare ruleset, 青天井, Hepburn: aotenjou, completely removes mangan, haneman, baiman, etc. and the score is completely based on the equation.

== Steps of calculation ==
The payment to the winner of a hand is calculated based on the number of han (飜) and fu (符). If in the case the hand does not contain at least five han, basic points are required to be counted based on how many fu; if the han and fu yield more than mangan, it is adjusted to a mangan, otherwise, basic points will be calculated.

The hand won by a dealer (x1.5 of value) or non-dealer and whether if it is tsumo (payment is split among three players) or ron (payment in full by the player in question) determines how are payments of points are considered. This is then followed by counters and in optional rules, adjusted based on the wareme.

In the case of a draw, points are transferred according to the nō-ten bappu rule. In the event of a penalty, such as claiming a win with an illegal hand, then points are transferred via the chombo rule.

=== Counting han ===
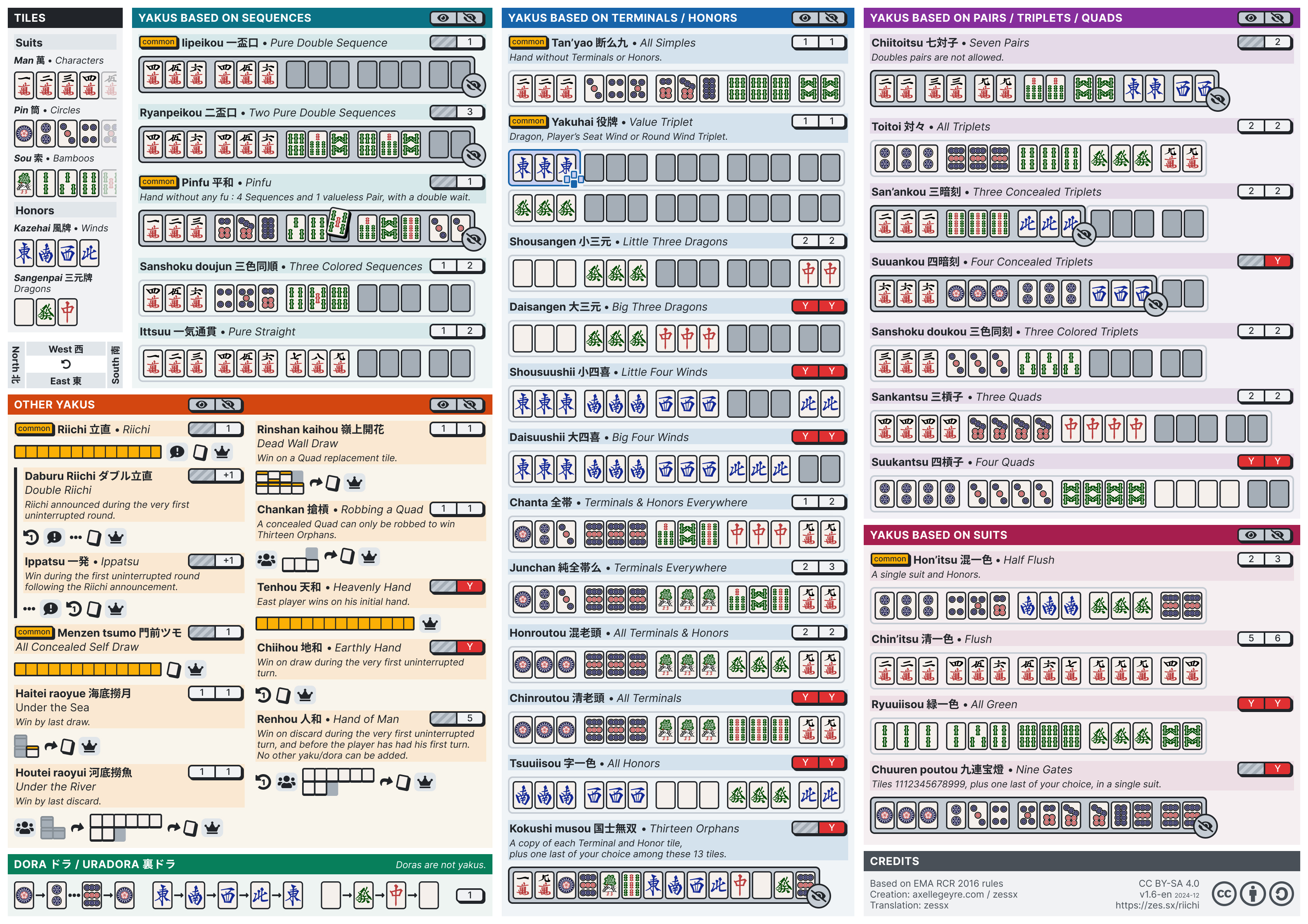
Yaku table

The total number of han (飜) of all the kinds of yaku (役; winning hand) in the hand is summed up. Each dora (ドラ) increases the han value of a hand. Dora are not regarded as yaku and thus cannot fulfill the win requirements.

If there is more than one way to arrange the winning hand, the arrangement with the highest han is used. For example, a hand could be either ryanpeikou (二盃口) or chiitoitsu (七対子), but since ryanpeikou is three han where chiitoitsu is two han, ryanpeikou should prevail. Some yaku have their han value reduced by one if the hand is not concealed.

If a hand has five han or more, it is always counted by mangan (満貫) as a unit and it is not necessary to calculate fu (符) or basic points unless the ruleset uses aotenjou.

=== Counting fu ===
Fu (符) or minipoints (EMA EU) are counted in the order below and then rounded up to the tens. There may be variations of rules for counting it. Three han with 70 fu or more and four han with 40 fu or more yield more than mangan and there is no need to calculate basic points.

Winning with yaku which include seven pairs (chiitoitsu, 七対子) is counted as 25 fu altogether. No more fu can be added and the value is not rounded up to the tens. (Some rules list chiitoitsu as 50 fu and one han, especially in the Kansai region. However, such would turn haneman+ hands one han harder.)

Any other winning hand starts with 20 fu, and is then checked for the following bonuses:

1. An additional +10 fu is added if the winner had a closed hand and won by ron (claiming a discarded tile.)
2. Fu is added for each component of the hand (each of the four melds and the one pair (Note: Any seven pairs hand is always awarded exactly 25 fu; all other fu calculations are skipped (including the step where fu is rounded up by tens).)). Different melds are worth different amounts of fu points; the sum value of all five components are awarded. The value of each component is listed in this table (with examples for each):
  Fu from melds and pairs
  Sequence Examples:	+0 fu
  Open triplet of simples (Note: The "simples" are the tiles numbered 2 to 8 inclusive.) Examples:	+2 fu
  Open triplet of honors or terminals (Note: The "terminals" are the tiles numbered one or nine:,,,,,.) Examples:	+4 fu
  Closed triplet of simples Examples:	+4 fu
  Closed triplet of honors or terminals Examples:	+8 fu
  Open quad of simples Examples:	+8 fu
  Open quad of honors or terminals Examples:	+16 fu
  Closed quad of simples Examples:	+16 fu
  Closed quad of honors or terminals Examples:	+32 fu
  Pair of dragons, the seat wind, (Note: The "seat wind" is whichever wind tile corresponds to the player's seat. For example, the seat wind of the player seated in the west seat would be the west tile.) or the round wind Examples: assuming player prevailing wind/seat wind is South	+2 fu (Note: If the seat wind and round wind are the same, a pair of that wind will instead award +4 fu.)
  Any other pair Examples: assuming player seat wind isn't North	+0 fu
3. If the winning tile was either part of the pair, the middle tile of a sequence, or a simple tile in a sequence also containing a terminal, the hand is awarded +2 fu.
4. If the winning tile was self-drawn, and the hand does not have the pinfu yaku, +2 fu is awarded.
5. At this point, if the hand has not accumulated any fu past its starting balance of 20, and it is an open hand, it is awarded +2 fu.
6. Finally, if the running tally of fu is not a multiple of 10, it is rounded up to the next highest multiple of 10. This is the final result.

=== Scoring the hand ===
The method of calculating a winning hand's score from han and fu is somewhat tedious, so it is easier to use a pre-computed lookup table. Expert and professional players have this table memorized and can thus tell the value of a hand at a glance. Each of the table's point values is derived from the scoring equation and procedure with each corresponding han and fu value.

The formula itself is fu × 2^{(2+han)}. This produces the hand's "basic" points. If the dealer wins, they are owed 6 × basic; a non-dealer winner is owed 4 × basic. If it was a win by discard, the player who discarded the winning tile is fully liable. Otherwise, for a self-drawn win, all three other players split the bill (evenly if the dealer won; otherwise, the dealer pays half, and the other two players pay a quarter each). All payments are then rounded up to the next hundred, and while the values of han and fu are the same, the points received for self-draw wins often slightly deviate from those received for discard wins because of rounding. Theoretically, the maximum fu for a hand is 120; however, because one or two han has a theoretical maximum fu of 110, achieving mangan is therefore impossible.

To use the table, simply look up the values that correspond to the han and fu counts of the hand. The top numbers in each cell indicate the payout from a player who discards a winning tile. The numbers in brackets indicate the payout for each player in the event the winning tile is self-drawn. If the winner is the dealer, each player pays the same amount. If the winner is a non-dealer, then the other two non-dealers pay the smaller number, while the dealer pays the larger number.

Winner is dealer				Fu	Winner is non-dealer			
4 han (Note: A hand with 5+ han is an automatic mangan, or a multiple thereof (haneman/baiman/sanbaiman/kazoe yakuman). See § Mangan.)	3 han	2 han	1 han	Fu	1 han	2 han	3 han	4 han
— (2600)	— (1300)	— (700)	— (Note: The only 20 fu hands are the no-points hand (pinfu, 平和) where the hand is won by a self-drawn tile. However, since a no-points hand must be concealed, it makes winning via a self-drawn tile automatically add 1 han towards the total, therefore, a 1 han 20 fu hand cannot exist. The lowest 20 fu hand is a self-drawn no-points hand, for a total of 2 han 20 fu. (When playing with physical tiles, a 1 han 20 fu score may be awarded by integrating the winning tile into the physical hand before winning via a self-drawn tile. No-points hand requires two-way waits, which is unclear in such case. Thus, the hand would only score 1 han for a self-drawn tile, and no fu other than the base 20 fu. The score would be 400 from dealer/200 from two other non-dealers each for non-dealer and 400 from each for dealer.))	20 fu	—	— (400/700)	— (700/1300)	— (1300/2600)
9600 (3200)	4800 (1600)	2400 (— (Note: A Seven pairs hand is fixed at 25 fu. Since the hand is always concealed, it adds 1 han for a self-drawn tile, hence bringing its han value to 3. The 2 han 25 fu is thus only applicable for discards.))	— (Note: Only Seven pairs can result in 25 fu. Therefore, since the hand is valued at 2 han, a 1 han 25 fu hand cannot exist.)	25 fu	—	1600 (—)	3200 (800/1600)	6400 (1600/3200)
11600 (3900)	5800 (2000)	2900 (1000)	1500 (500)	30 fu	1000 (300/500)	2000 (500/1000)	3900 (1000/2000)	7700 (2000/3900)
Mangan	7700 (2600)	3900 (1300)	2000 (700)	40 fu	1300 (400/700)	2600 (700/1300)	5200 (1300/2600)	Mangan
Mangan	9600 (3200)	4800 (1600)	2400 (800)	50 fu	1600 (400/800)	3200 (800/1600)	6400 (1600/3200)	Mangan
Mangan	11600 (3900)	5800 (2000)	2900 (1000)	60 fu	2000 (500/1000)	3900 (1000/2000)	7700 (2000/3900)	Mangan
Mangan	Mangan	6800 (2300)	3400 (1200)	70 fu	2300 (600/1200)	4500 (1200/2300)	Mangan	Mangan
Mangan	Mangan	7700 (2600)	3900 (1300)	80 fu	2600 (700/1300)	5200 (1300/2600)	Mangan	Mangan
Mangan	Mangan	8700 (2900)	4400 (1500)	90 fu	2900 (800/1500)	5800 (1500/2900)	Mangan	Mangan
Mangan	Mangan	9600 (3200)	4800 (1600)	100 fu	3200 (800/1600)	6400 (1600/3200)	Mangan	Mangan
Mangan	Mangan	10600 (3600)	5300 (1800)	110 fu	3600 (900/1800)	7100 (1800/3600)	Mangan	Mangan

==== Mangan and Yakuman ====
When it is clear that a hand reaches basic points of more than 2,000, it is limited to full basic points of 2,000 and called mangan (満貫). Reaching certain number of han increases the multiplier bonus.

Mangan level	Minimum value		Base value	Multiplier	Payment	
Mangan level	Han	Fu	Base value	Multiplier	Dealer	Non-dealer
Mangan (満貫)	3	70	2,000	×1	12000 (4000)	8000 (2000/4000)
Mangan (満貫)	4	40	2,000	×1	12000 (4000)	8000 (2000/4000)
Mangan (満貫)	5	—N/a (Note: Mangan disregards counting of fu value, unless rules relating to aotenjo apply. If rules as such award a mangan value (such as nagashi mangan or Blessing of Man, it is valued at the 5 han by default, and in the latter case, can be valued at 6, 8, 11 or 13 han depending on which mangan value is set. If Kazoe-Yakuman is disallowed in some rules, Kazoe-Yakuman scores sanbaiman). While achieving a hand of at least 26 han (an equivalent of two yakuman) is extremely rare, it is still treated as a Kazoe-Yakuman as a one yakuman regardless, though doubling of the points are not commonly used in such extreme cases.)	2,000	×1	12000 (4000)	8000 (2000/4000)
Haneman (跳満)	6	—N/a	3,000	×1.5	18000 (6000)	12000 (3000/6000)
Baiman (倍満)	8	—N/a	4,000	×2	24000 (8000)	18000 (4000/8000)
Sanbaiman (三倍満)	11	—N/a	6,000	×3	36000 (12000)	24000 (6000/12000)
Kazoe-Yakuman (数え役満)	13	—N/a	8,000	×4	48000 (16000)	32000 (8000/16000)
Yakuman (役満)	—N/a (Note: Yakuman hands are separate from regular yaku hands and thus han or fu are not counted. However, yakuman can be combined with other hands. Theoretically, the maximum score one player can win with yakuman is four. In some rulesets, four different yakuman hands have a secondary criteria which double the value, namely Four Concealed Triplets (single wait), Four Winds (big), Thirteen Orphans (13-wait) and Nine Gates (nine-wait); this brings the maximum possible score to six yakuman (achieved with a single-wait Four Concealed Triplets, Big Four Winds, Four Quads and All Honors hands).)		8,000	×4	48000 (16000)	32000 (8000/16000)

=== Example calculations ===
Example 1: The player on the right of the dealer goes out by self-draw. (The dealer's wind is always East in Japanese rules.) The winner's hand is closed and has a closed triplet (ankō) of Souths. The player also has two Whites as the pair (toitsu) and the winning tile is a White. The yaku are "self-pick" (menzenchin-tsumo-hō) and "honor tiles" (yakuhai), and they yield a total of two han. The sum of fu is 20 (fūtei) + 8 (a closed triplet of Souths) + 2 (a pair of Whites) + 2 (pair wait) + 2 (self-draw) = 34 fu, rounded up to 40 fu.

The basic points are thus 40 × 2^{(2+2)} = 640. The dealer pays the winner 640 × 2 = 1,280, rounded up to 1,300 points. The other two non-dealers pay the winner 640, rounded up to 700 points.

Example 2: The same player goes out by the same hand, except this time the winning tile was discarded by the player on the right. The resulting hand has one han of honor tiles. The number of fu is 20 (fūtei) + 10 (ron with a closed hand) + 8 (a closed triplet of Souths) + 2 (the pair of Whites) + 2 (pair wait) = 42 fu, rounded up to 50 fu.

The basic point is thus 50 × 2^{(2+1)} = 400. The discarder pays the winner 400 × 4 = 1,600 points. The other two players pay the winner nothing.

==== One han 110 fu ====
It is possible for a hand to have one han with 102 fu (rounded up to 110 fu) if the rules allow a pair to have four fu when it is made of wind tiles that are both the seat wind and the prevailing wind. Some rules consider that such a pair is still worth two fu, making the hand have exactly 100 fu.

An example of a hand that has one han with 110 fu (winning by a discard):

The hand has yakuhai of one han with 20 fu of fūtei, 10 fu of menzen-kafu, 32 fu of ankan, 32 fu of ankan, four fu of minkō, and four fu of toitsu. East is both the player's seat wind and the round's prevailing wind in this case. This is the largest amount of fu that a hand with one han can have.

== Exhaustive draws ==
On plenty of occasions, a hand ends with all tiles drawn and the 14 tiles in the dead wall remain. Yet, no player wins the hand. This is the exhaustive draw. In this case, points may be exchanged barring any tenpai hands vs nōten hands. After each exhaustive draw, the counter increases by one.

=== Tenpai ===
Tenpai (聴牌) means one tile short of a winning hand. To be tenpai, a hand does not need any particular yaku partly because winning by the last discard is yaku itself. When a hand is not tenpai, the situation is called nōten (ノー聴: nō is English "no" and ten for tenpai).

Players must show their hand to verify that it is tenpai when a hand is a draw and if they declared rīchi or if they declare tenpai. If a hand with rīchi declaration is nōten, a chombo penalty is imposed. In some cases, a player who didn't declare rīchi can declare nōten even when the hand is tenpai to keep their hand concealed. If the abortive draw of all four players declaring rīchi occurred, these players must show their hands to prove it is valid.

=== Point exchange ===
Players receive or pay points called nō-ten bappu (ノー聴罰符; fu of penalty for nōten) in the following way when a hand ends in an exhaustive draw:

1. One player is in a state of tenpai, the player gets 1,000 points from each of the other three players and receives total of 3,000.
2. Two players are tenpai, they get 1,500 each and the other two players pay 1,500 each.
3. Three players are tenpai, they get 1,000 each and the other player pays 3,000.
4. The players are all tenpai or all nōten, no payment is made.

In most rules when a dealer's hand is nōten, the dealer changes and the game wind may change. But if it's the last hand of the last round, in some rules, a game does not end if the dealer declares nōten.

=== Nagashi mangan ===
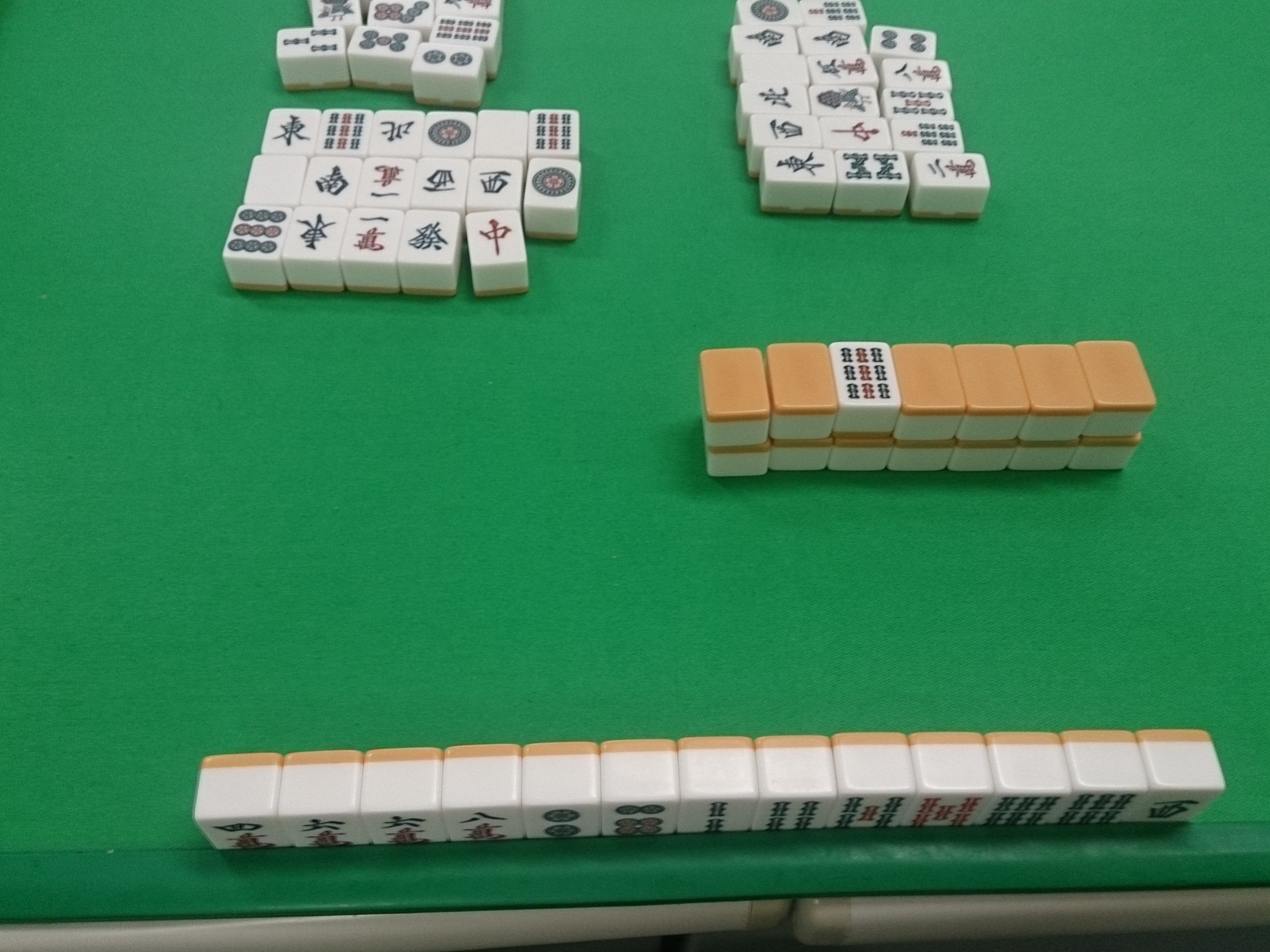
Nagashi mangan at draw: all of the winner's discards were terminals or honors.

Nagashi mangan is an uncommon special outcome to an exhaustive draw which occurs when a player has met the following conditions:

- All of their discards were of terminals and/or honors.
- None of their discards were taken by others to form open melds.
- Their hand was closed (it does not matter if it had tenpai).

If this occurs, the tenpai/nōten point exchange is canceled and the player responsible is instead paid by the others as though they had won with a self-drawn mangan. Nagashi mangan does not have an official English name, and this situation is not a legal valid hand in the ruleset, such as the American Riichi Mahjong League.

== Counters ==
When there are counter sticks (honba) on the table, winners get bonus points calculated by multiplying 300 by the number of those counters. Honba (本場) is a unit of continuous dealer wins and draws, and to be exact, hon (本) is a unit of numbers of some bars and so on, and ba (場) means a scene or a situation.

The dealer keeps count of the number of continuous dealer wins and draws by placing point sticks on the table. While point sticks are usually used for scoring, here they are used merely as counters, a visual aid. The initial count is zero. The number of counters increases by one when:

- (1) the dealer wins a hand
- (2) a hand is a draw (ryūkyoku, 流局)
- (3) an abortive draw happens.

In the case of (1) or (3), the dealer remains the same. In the case of (2), when the dealer cannot declare tenpai, the dealer changes, but the number of counters increases regardless of whether the dealer declares tenpai. In all other cases, namely when only a non-dealer wins, the count is reset to zero.

Renchan (連荘) is a situation in which a player successively plays the dealer, and is often only caused by dealer's win or tenpai; therefore, draws are not always renchan. On the other hand, the number of honba always increases when a draw or a dealer's win occurs. If the dealer changes, it is called rinchan (輪荘) instead of renchan, and happens for example by their nōten in the case of a draw.

In a state of n counters (suppose n is a number), when a player wins a hand by self-draw (tsumo), the player gets a bonus of n × 100 points from each of other three players for a total of n × 300, and when a player wins by claiming a discard (ron, 栄), the player gets a bonus of n × 300 from the discarder.

Example:

- East round, 4th rotation with 0 counters (東4局0本場). The dealer (East) wins the hand. The seat winds don't rotate. Dealer puts 1 counter on the table.
- East round, 4th rotation with 1 counter (東4局1本場). Hand is a draw with the dealer not declaring tenpai. The seat winds rotate. The former dealer retrieves the 1 counter and the new dealer places 2 counters.
- South round, 1st rotation with 2 counters (南1局2本場). North wins by ron (claiming a discard), getting a bonus of 600 points from the discarder. The seat winds rotate and the former dealer retrieves the 2 counters.
- South round, 2nd rotation with 0 counters (南2局0本場).

Optionally, a rule may add the restriction of ryanhan-shibari (二飜縛り; literally "two-han binding"). Here, players must produce hands of two han or more from yaku when the honba count surpasses a certain number. Usually, this count is five or more.

== Chombo ==
Under the rule of chombo (チョンボ, 錯和 or 冲和), a player is given an infraction. Point penalties vary by organizations and/or events. Typically, a player pays a penalty of the same amount as mangan to other players in most rules. A non-dealer pays 4,000 to East and 2,000 to the other two players, while a dealer pays 4,000 to each. In other times, chombo does not affect the current score of the game; and instead, the penalty is applied at the end of the game. Chombo occurs for any of the following:

- Invalidly claiming a winning hand(gotsumo / goron)
- Winning on a discard under the situation of sacred discard (furiten) (furiten riichi)
- Revealing a false riichi, that is, riichi with a hand that is not in the state of tenpai or is open
- Closed kan after riichi if the kan changes the hand structure or wait, or if the four tiles are already integrated into the hand (it must include the newly drawn tile) (in other words a kan of a tile after riichi is not allowed if the hand can be interpreted such that the tile is a part of a sequence)
- Having more or less tiles than allowed (taahai and shoohai respectively) (depending on the rules)
- Knocking the wall over so that it cannot be recovered to the way it was before (yamakuzure)

In game infractions, such as the false riichi and invalid kan after riichi, they are caught only after draws or winning declarations by players who declared the riichi. If other players happen to win the hand, then the infractions are not revealed and therefore made null and void. To stop this case from occurring, players may be forced to reveal their hand at the end of a hand regardless of the case. Any riichi bets are returned to the players after the end of a chombo hand.

Other settings for chombo apply point penalties after the game's conclusion. This is especially the case under tournament settings. Under this method, players do not benefit with any point gains. Instead, the infracted player solely takes a point deduction. The deduction may be set to any specified number.

== Final points and place ==
At the end of the game, the final scores may be calculated. Under casual game settings, this calculation is not necessary, but mostly required in other rules and formal settings such as tournaments. This calculation takes the game's scores and adjusts them according the setting of oka and uma, which were predetermined before the game. The calculation for each player is as follows:
$$End score = ((End points + Oka - Target)/1000) + Uma$$

- End score – the final score for the player
- End points – the player's points at the end of the final hand
- Oka – the point difference between the target score and the initial score of all players given to the winner
- Target – the target score, or the minimum score needed for a player to be declared first or the winner
- Uma – a set of four numbers applied to each player's placement

Point settings may vary but are always determined prior to the beginning of a game. In particular, different mahjong platforms utilize their own settings to uma.

== Optional scoring rules ==
=== Wareme ===
In the optional rule wareme (割れ目, ワレメ; fissure, split), the player in front of whom the wall was split to indicate the end of the dead wall, acquires and pays double the normal points. They are doubled after the points for counters are added. It is often especially called oya-ware (親割れ; parent's wareme) when the player is the dealer.

== See also ==
- Scoring in Mahjong
- Japanese Mahjong yaku
