= Xizi =

Xizi may refer to:

- Khizi District, Azerbaijan
  - Khizi, capital of Khizi District
- Alternative name of West Lake, Hangzhou
- Xi Shi, one of the Four Beauties of ancient China
- A summer sleeping mat or Mahjong mat
- Misspelling of Xici, part of the ancient divination text I Ching
