= Sleeping pad =

Type of portable mattress

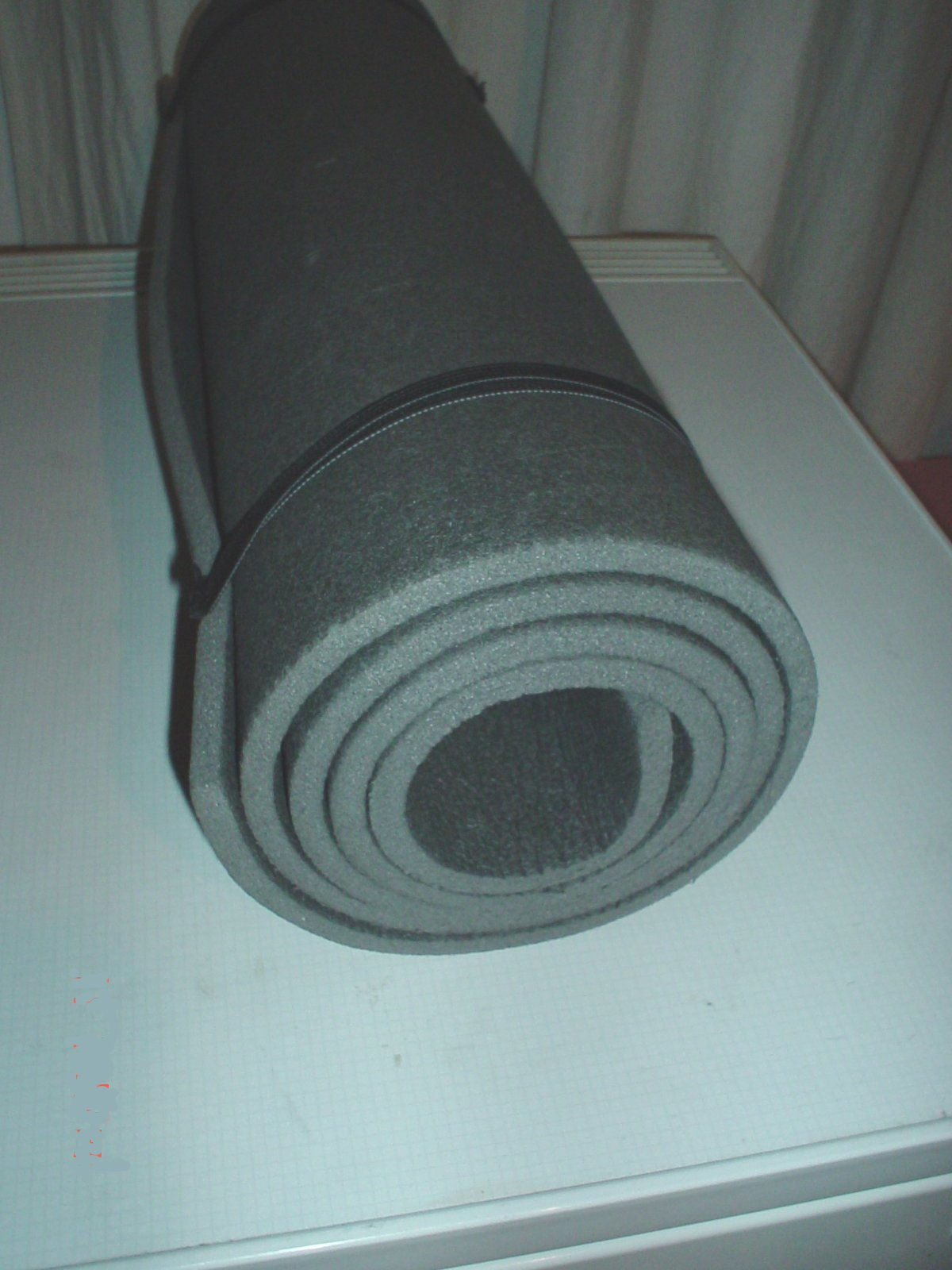
Rolled sleeping pad

In camping, a ground pad, sleeping pad, thermal pad, sleeping mat, or roll mat is lightweight pad, common among hikers, backpackers and budget travelers, often used in conjunction with a sleeping bag. Its purpose is to provide padding and thermal insulation.

In its simplest form a sleeping pad consists of a foam-like material that is about half a centimeter thick (about a quarter of an inch). The dimensions of the pad are usually about the same length as a sleeping bag and a little wider. Slight variations in design can be found, such as rippling in the foam, but these do not significantly affect the pad's thermal properties.

A common misconception is that the pads are primarily for creating a more comfortable sleeping or sitting area. Instead, the primary purpose of the pad is to prevent the loss of body heat into the ground while sleeping. The materials used are typically filled with air pockets, slowing down the conduction of heat through the pad, as air is one of the best (and cheapest) insulators.

== Types ==
=== Manually inflated ===
Closely related to the air mattress, a pad of this type requires an external pressure source to inflate, typically in the form of a pump or by blowing orally. Convection of the air inside the mattress reduces the amount of insulation it provides. More complicated mattresses reduce convection by partitioning the internal cavities, or by filling the cavities with material to trap the air such as down feathers or synthetic insulation. Manually inflated pads have the advantage of offering good thickness and a great deal of comfort while being lightweight and able to pack to a small size.

=== Self-inflating ===
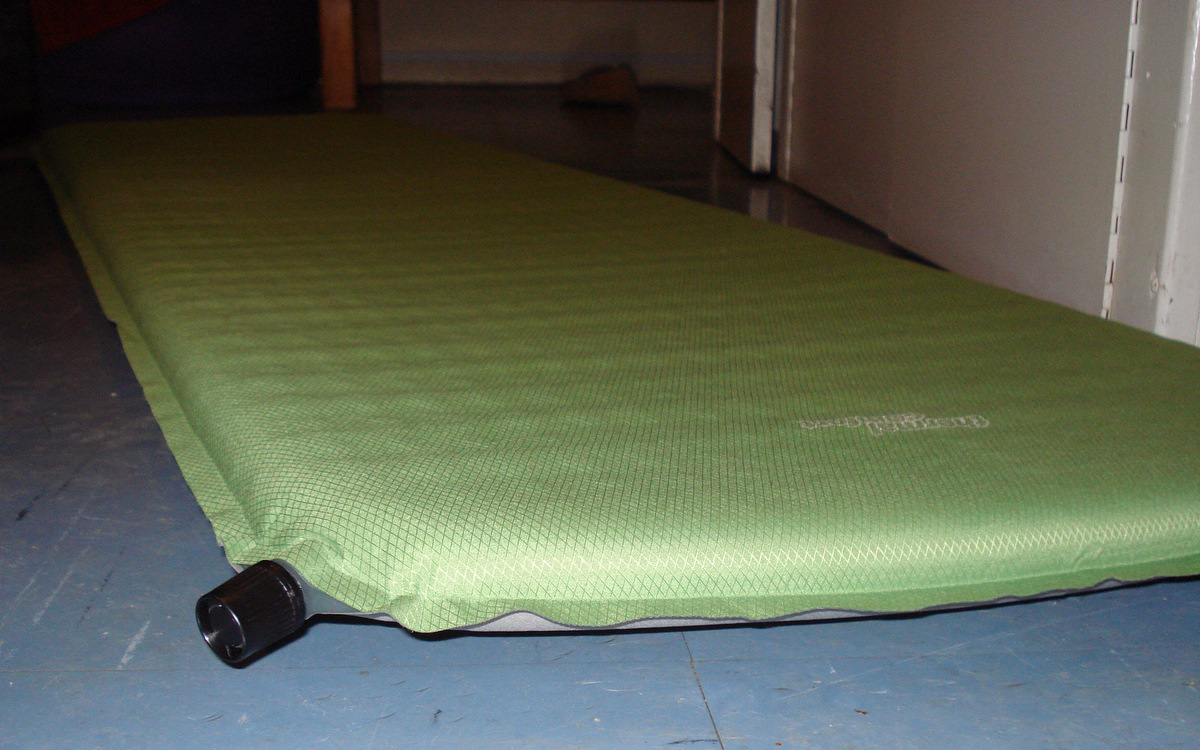
An example of a self-inflating mattress made from diamond ripstop. The black high-volume valve can be seen in the left foreground.

An extension on the conventional manually inflated mattress, this type is capable of self-inflation due to the open-cell foam that fills the internal cavity. For many years this design was protected by various patents held by Cascade Designs and they were an unusual and premium item. But since these patents expired many other manufacturers are now producing this type of mattress and they are now commonplace. These mattresses are lightweight and pack to a small size, which make them popular amongst hikers and campers.

=== Foam ===
Closed-cell foam is used to produce mats that can be used without requiring any inflation. Closed-cell foam pads are lighter and more durable than their self-inflating counterparts, as they are constructed of fewer materials and not susceptible to damage from accidental puncture. Many may also be trimmed to size should the user choose to do so. However, they are generally not as comfortable as manually inflated and self-inflating mats because they are thinner, and may also take up more space in a pack, depending on the materials used. Variations include textured or shaped foam to increase the unrolled volume and/or change the stiffness of the mattress. This can also be used to trap the air within ridges or an egg-carton type of texture.

Open-cell foam, although comfortable, is rarely used in the outdoors due to its ability to absorb water (like a sponge) and its air cells are crushed in use reducing its insulation capacity.

== Insulation ratings ==
A sleeping pads's warmth is characterized by R-value. But unlike sleeping bags' EN 13537 test standard and widely accepted recommendations, sleeping pad R-values lacks a simple mapping and label for 'how much warmth' a consumer should expect. Combining various standards and various authors' research, an approximate R-value to temperature chart follows:

Air/ground Temperature	R-value for standard	
Air/ground Temperature	male	female
5 °C (40 °F)	5	6
−7 °C (20 °F)	7	8
−18 °C (0 °F)	9	10
−30 °C (−20 °F)	11	13

Same as EN 13537, a "standard man" is assumed to be 25 years old, with a height of 1.73 m and a weight of 73 kg; a "standard woman" is assumed to be 25 years old, with a height of 1.60 m and a weight of 60 kg. The sleeping bag and pad system (above, below, and sides) should provide the same insulation value all around a person, but cost, size, weight, comfort, and lack-of-knowledge often lead persons to reduce the R-value to below their personal 'recommended R-value'. Since the pad and bag work together, a 'warmer' bag can compensate the a 'thin' pad and a 'thick pad' for a 'cold' bag. Highly heat-conductive surfaces (e.g. concrete, granite) require more insulation for the same temperature than insulating ground surfaces (e.g.snow, dry moss, loose soil, wood, etc.). More heat is lost downward when sleeping on one's stomach vs sleeping one's side (due to reduced contact area and cooler body parts in contact). Most persons can 'feel the cold ground' at approximately half the 'recommended R-values'.

Sleeping pads R-values range from 1 to more than 10. A few category examples follow:

Make/ model	R-value	Approximate cost
Common air mattress	0.7	US$10
Common 10 mm (3/8 in) closed-cell foam pad	1.4	US$10
Advanced foam pad	3.5	US$40
25 mm (1 in) self-inflating mat	3.4	US$70
Advanced air mattress	6	US$200
Down-filled air mattress	9	US$200
50 mm (2 in) folding DIY EPS foam	10	US$15

== See also ==
- Swag (bedroll)
- Mahjong mat
- Yoga mat
- Mattress
