= George B. Glover =

American diplomat

George Bunker Glover
- Occupation: Commissioner
- Employer: Chinese Maritime Customs Service

George Bunker Glover (traditional Chinese: 吉羅福, simplified Chinese: 吉罗福; 8 Jul 1827 - 4 Oct 1885) was an American who served as a diplomat and also a commissioner in the Imperial Chinese Maritime Customs Service during the late nineteenth century.

== Career ==
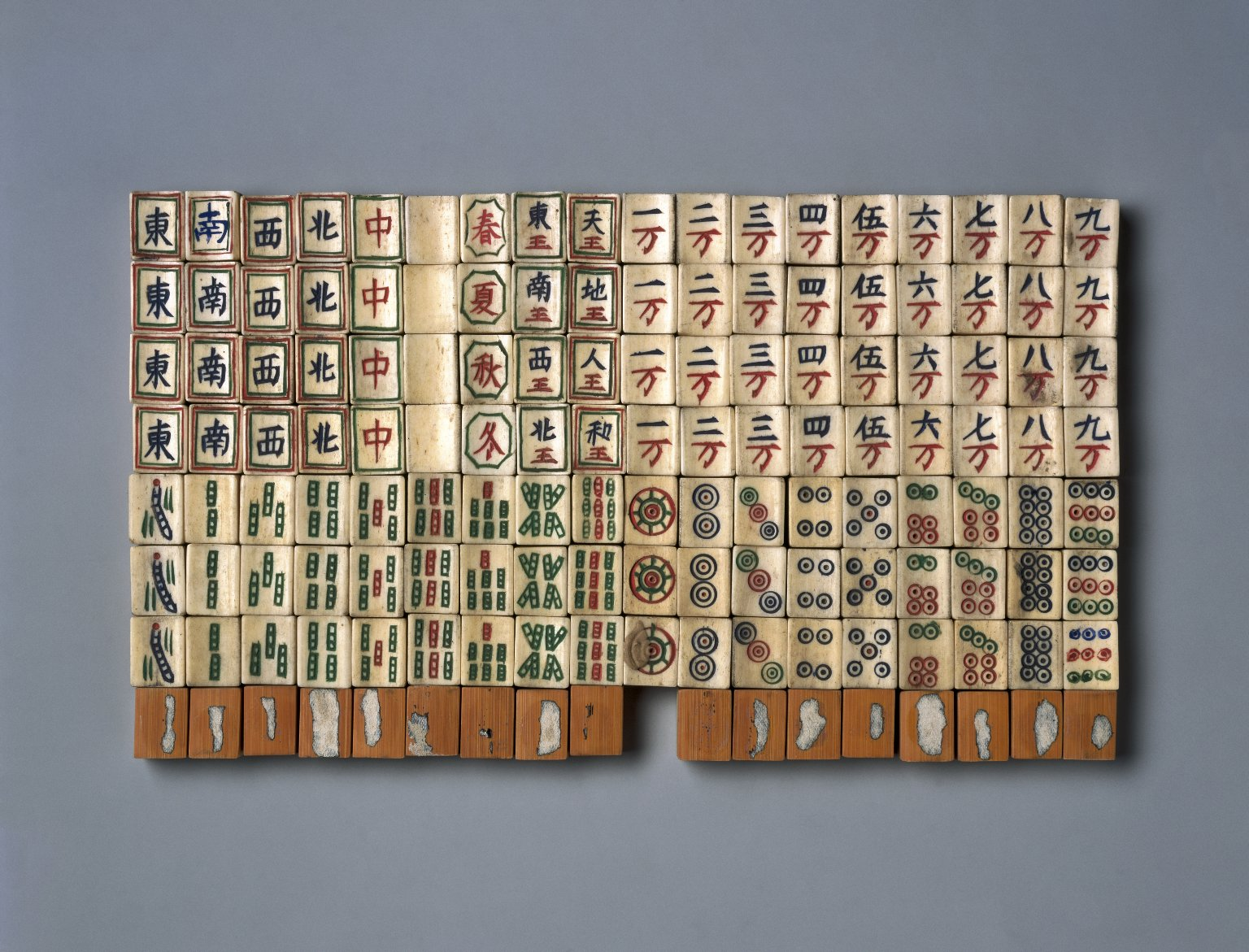
Mahjong tiles of late 19th century, a gift of Glover to the Long Island Historical Society in 1875.

Apr 1858 or before: Sep 1858 or after	United States Vice-Consul and Acting Consul at Shanghai
around Jun 1859	United States Consul at Shanghai
1859-1870	Commissioner of Maritime Customs at Canton (see Fairbank et al., p. 41)
1870-1872	on home leave (see Fairbank et al., p. 70)
Apr 1872-Oct 1873	Commissioner of Maritime Customs at Fuzhou
around 1876	Commissioner of Maritime Customs at Shanghai (see Fairbank et al., p. 227)
around 1877	Chairman of Shantung Famine Relief Fund (China Famine Relief Fund later)
around 1879	Consul at Shanghai
around 1882	Commissioner of Maritime Customs at Jiujiang
