= Mahjong tiles =

Tiles used in mahjong game

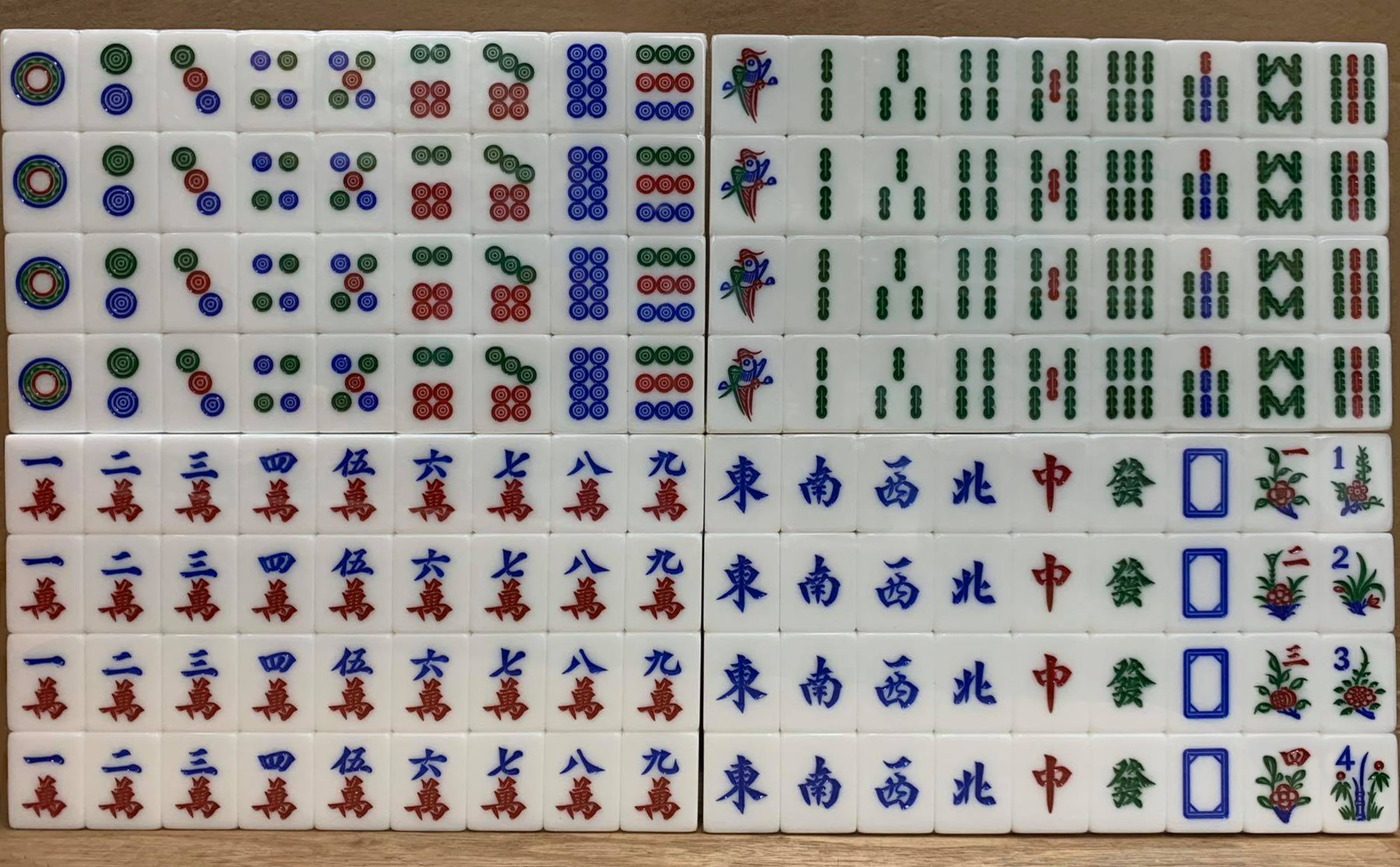
A set of standard Mahjong tiles

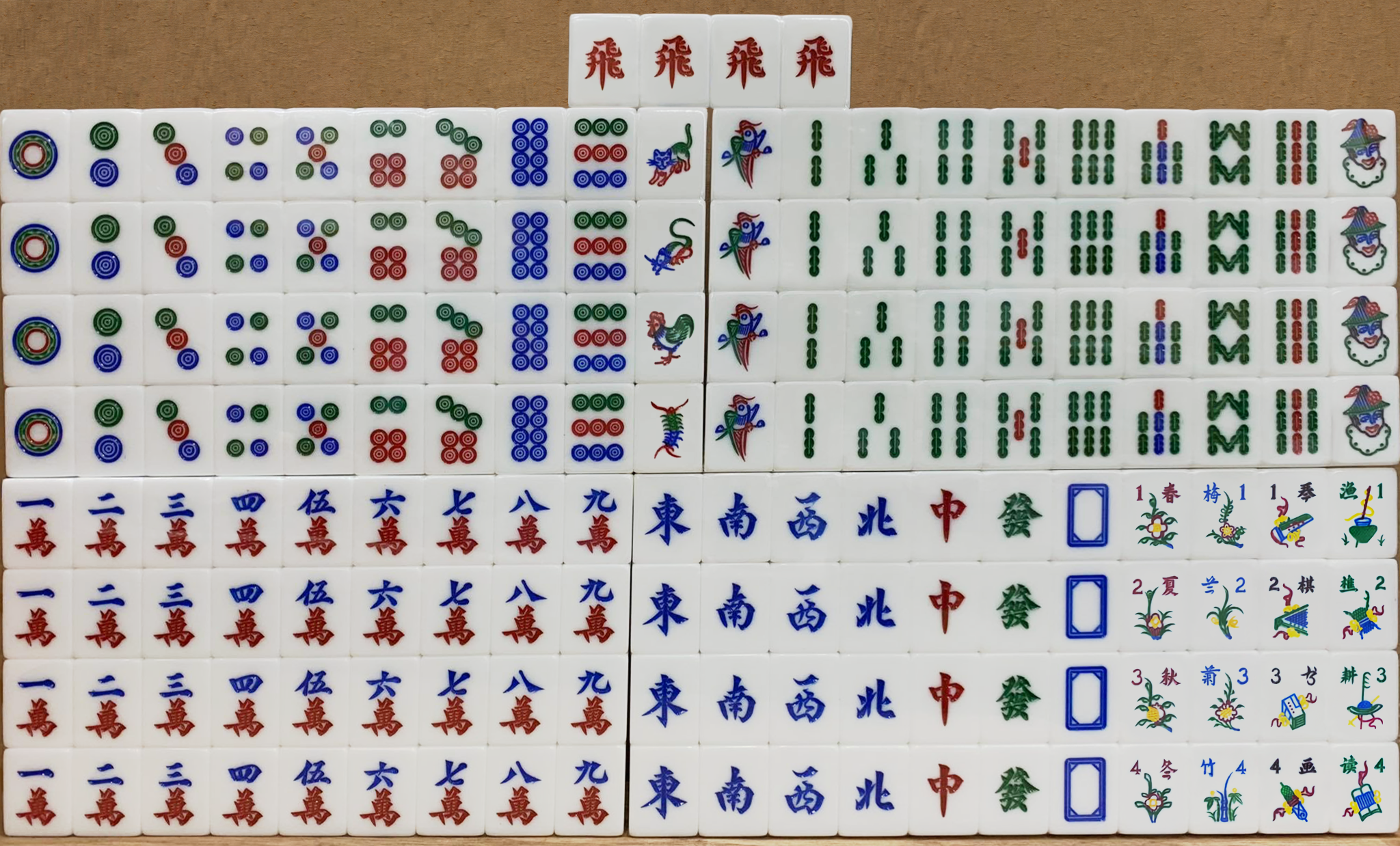
A set of Malaysian Mahjong tiles

Mahjong tiles (Chinese: 麻將牌 or 麻雀牌; pinyin: májiàngpái; Cantonese Jyutping: maa^{4}zoek^{3}paai^{2}; Japanese: 麻雀牌; rōmaji: mājanpai) are tiles of Chinese origin that are used to play mahjong as well as mahjong solitaire and other games. Although they are most commonly tiles, they may refer to playing cards with similar contents as well.

== Development ==
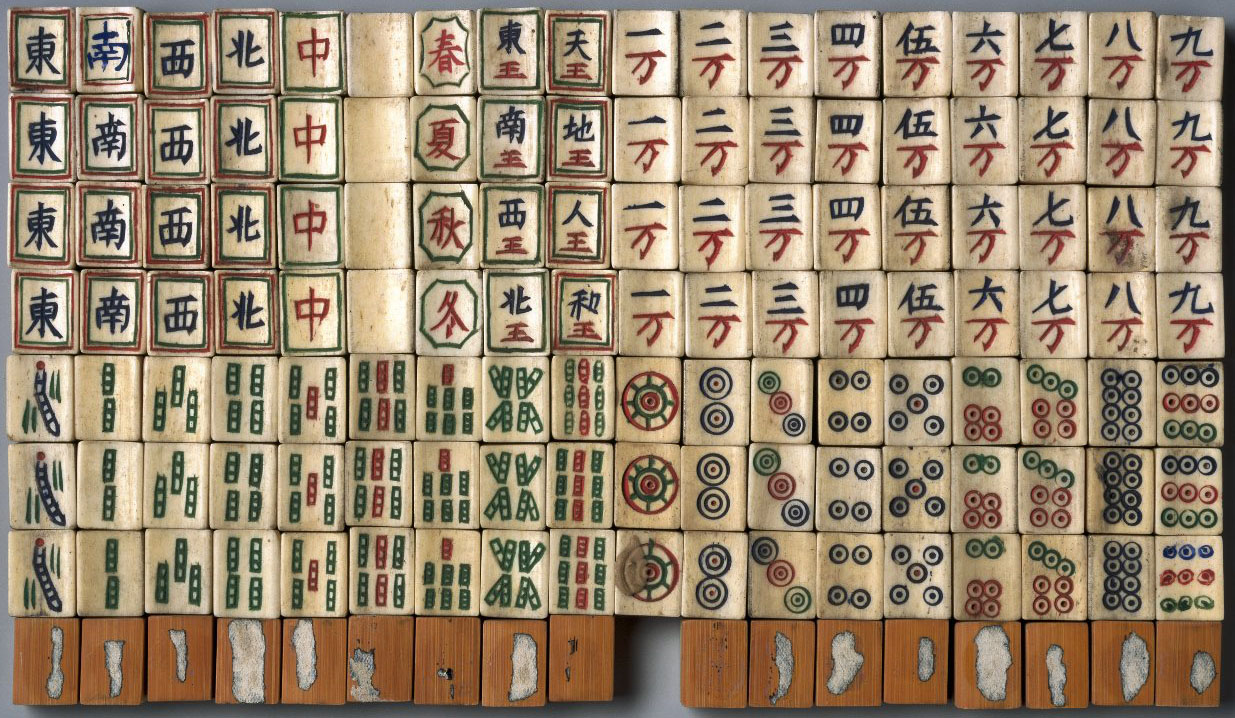
Glover's set (early 1870s)

The earliest surviving mahjong sets date to the 1870s when the game was largely confined to Zhejiang, Shanghai, and Jiangsu. They already exhibited various traits found in modern sets. The core of the set is the 108 suited tiles which were inherited from Chinese money-suited playing cards. The Wind honor tiles and the Four Seasons tiles were also found in the earliest sets. The honor tiles known as Arrows (Dragons in English) developed to their current form by 1890 concurrent with a new style of play called Zhōngfā (中發). Flower tiles, once known as Outer Flowers (Chinese: 外花; pinyin: wàihuā; Jyutping: ngoi^{6} faa^{1}), were not universally accepted until the 1920s. In contrast, many early sets contained wild cards with specific powers known as Inner Flowers (Chinese: 裏花; pinyin: lǐhuā; Jyutping: leoi^{5} faa^{1}) which disappeared from most of China but are still found in Vietnam.

== Contents ==
=== Full set ===
		Numbers								
		1	2	3	4	5	6	7	8	9
Suits	Circles									
Suits	Bamboo									
Suits	Characters									
Honors		Winds				Dragons			Bonus	
Honors		East	South	West	North	Red	Green	White	Seasons	Flowers

A set of Mahjong tiles will usually differ from place to place. It usually has at least 136 tiles (four copies of each of the Suit and Honor Tiles), most commonly 144, although sets originating from the United States or Southeast Asia will usually feature more tiles in the form of flowers or Jokers. Some sets also contain blank tiles which owners can use to replace damaged or missing tiles.

Mahjong tiles can be organized into several categories:

=== Suited tiles ===
Suited tiles (Chinese: 序數牌; pinyin: xùshùpái; lit. 'ordinal number tiles'; also Chinese: 數字牌; pinyin: shùzìpái; Cantonese Jyutping: sou3zi6paai2; lit. 'number tiles'; also Japanese: 数牌; rōmaji: shūpai/suupai; lit. 'number tiles') have a suit and a rank. There are three money-based suits with ranks ranging from one to nine. There are four tiles of each rank and suit combination, thus there are 36 tiles in a suit, and 108 suited tiles in total. To refer to a suited tile, the rank is named, followed by the suit. The ones and nines of each suit (Chinese: 幺九; pinyin: yāo jiǔ; Cantonese Jyutping: jiu1gau2; Japanese: ヤオ九; rōmaji: yaochū) are collectively referred to as the terminal tiles. Suited tiles may be used to form melds.

==== Circles ====
The circle (dot, coin, wheel, stone) suit (Chinese: 筒子; pinyin: tǒngzi; Cantonese Jyutping: tung^{4}zi^{2}; lit. 'barrel'; also Chinese: 餅子; pinyin: bǐngzi; Japanese: ピンズ; rōmaji: pinzu; lit. 'cake') is represented by a series of circles.

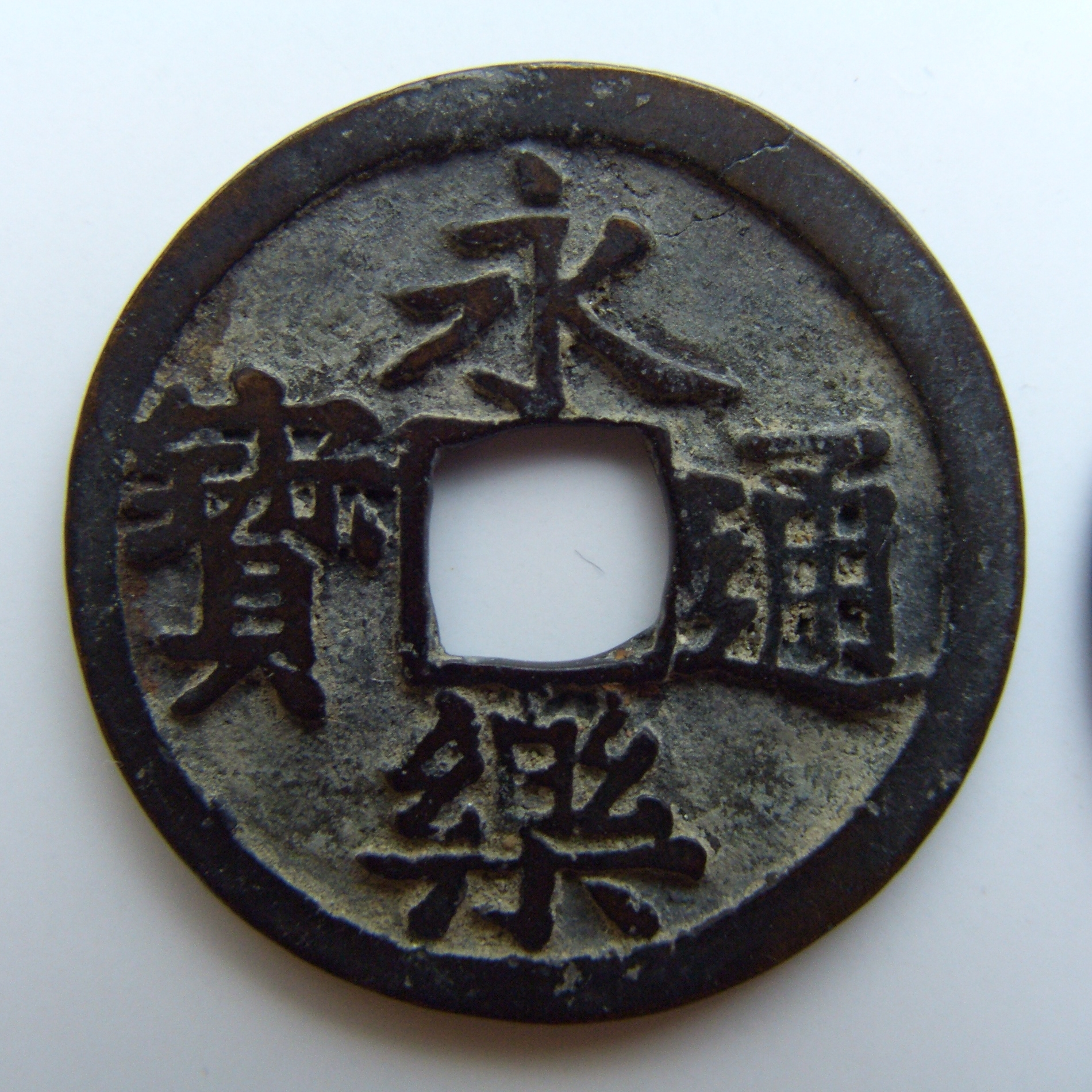
The circles represent copper coins like this.

The 1 Circle is generally a large circle of multiple colors, while the rest of the circle tiles consist of smaller circles, each circle being of one color. The 2 Circle consists of a green and a blue circle, the 3 consisting of one green, one red, and one blue circle arranged diagonally (the order the circles appear in, as well as the orientation, differs between sets). The 4 Circle has two blue circles and two green circles, arranged in a rectangle with circles of like color in opposite corners. The 5 Circle is similar to the 4 Circle, with another circle (its color depending on the set) in the middle. The 6 Circle consists of two green circles at the top and four red circles in the bottom (with a space between the green and red circles). The 7 Circle is similar to the 6 Circle, but has 3 green circles arranged diagonally from top-left to bottom-right. The 8 Circle has eight blue circles arranged in a 2x4 rectangle. The 9 Circle has three each of green, red, and blue circles, with each color occupying a row. There is some space between each row, and the middle row is always of the red circles (the blue and green, of course, depends on the orientation of the tile).

Because of the large size of the circle in the 1 Circle, it is commonly nicknamed da bing (大餅 pinyin dàbǐng, literally: "big pancake").

From the monetary origin of this suit, the circles represent the copper coins known in English as "cash". (1銅=one copper coin).

==== Bamboo ====
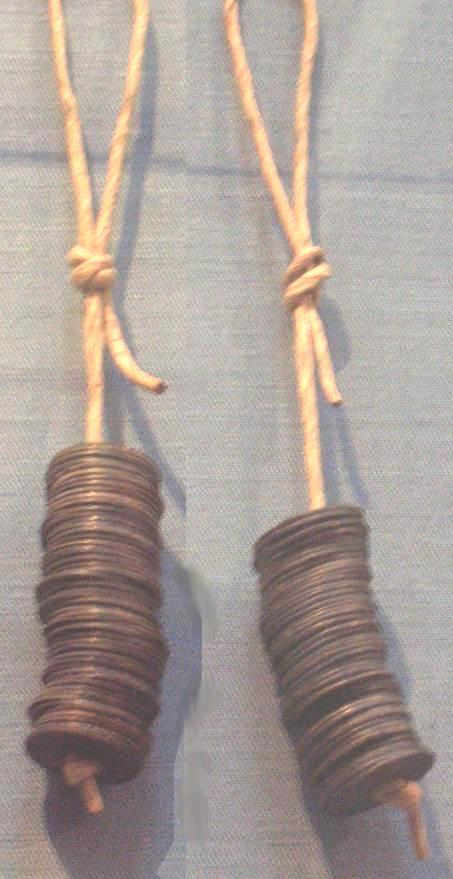
Strings of coins

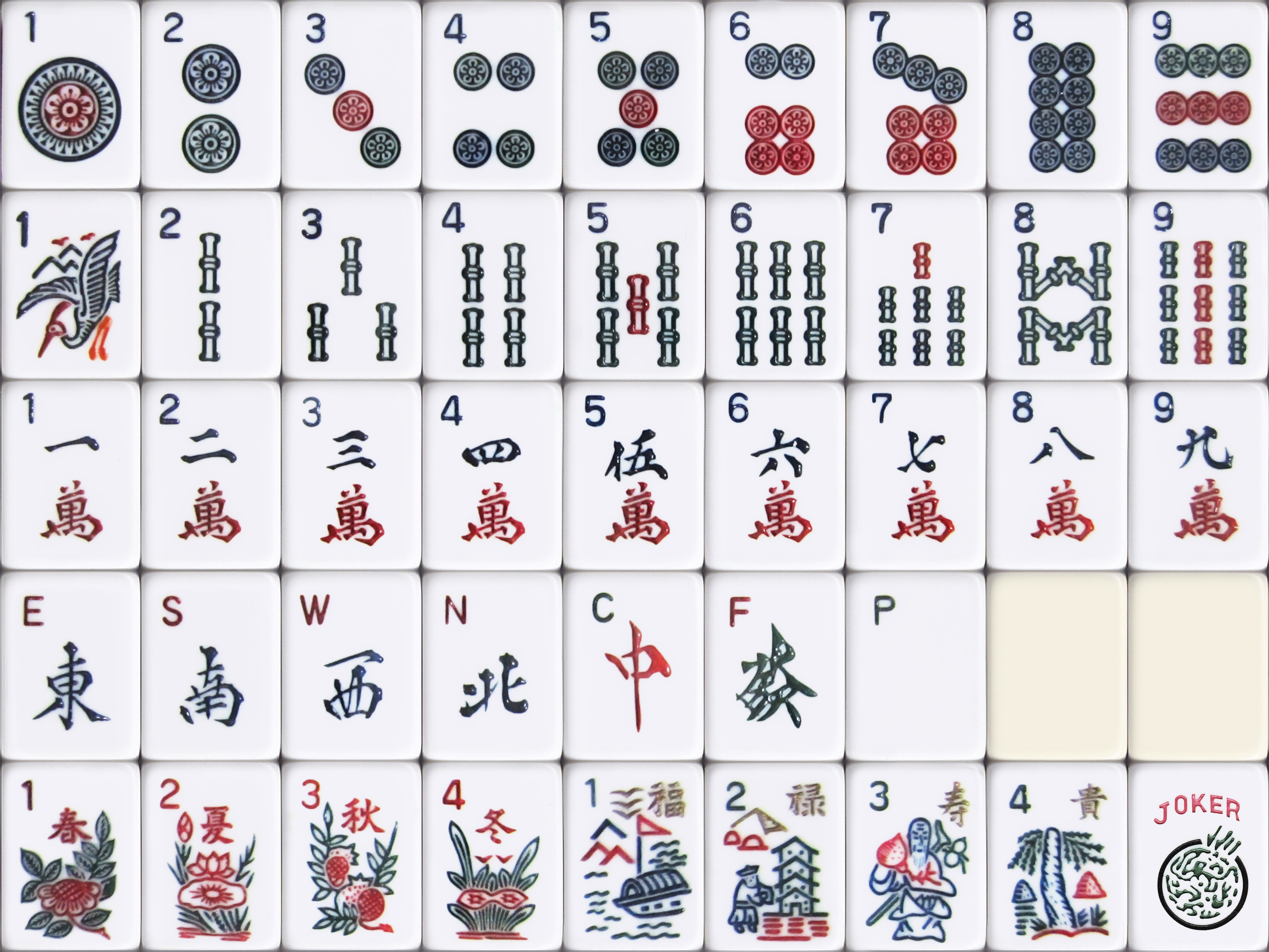
The bamboo (stick, string, bam) suit (Chinese and Japanese: 索子; pinyin: suǒzi; Cantonese Jyutping: sok^{3}zi^{2}; rōmaji: sōzu; lit. 'woven thread'; also Chinese: 條/条; pinyin: tiáo; lit. 'strip'), with the exception of the 1 Bamboo, which is commonly represented by a bird (like,,,, or ), is represented by outlines of sticks.

or
or

The 2, 3, 4, 6, and 8 Bamboo are represented entirely out of green sticks only or blue and green sticks, while the middle stick in the 5 Bamboo, the top stick of the 7 Bamboo, and the sticks along the center column of the 9 Bamboo are red. Some sets may also have the sticks along the bottom row or center column of the 7 Bamboo in blue. The 8 Bamboo has its sticks forming an M-shape and its mirror image.

From the monetary origin of this suit, the sticks are actually rope strings (索) that tie 100 Chinese copper coins together by the square holes in the middle. (1索=100銅) The repeated bumps in the sticks depict the individual coins in the strings, but they were mistaken by Joseph Park Babcock as the knots on the bamboo plants, hence the English name of the suit. The 1 Bamboo, as it commonly depicts a bird, is often referred as the sparrow (麻雀 - má què); in Japan it is most commonly a peacock. In early sets, there was no bird but a single bent string of cash capped with a red knot.

==== Characters ====
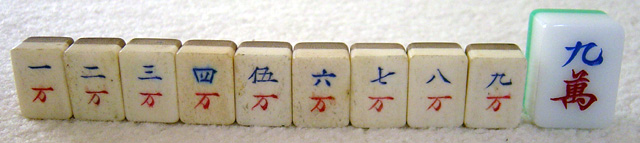
Old tiles used the cursive character "万".

The character (myriad, number, crack) suit (Chinese: 萬子/万子; pinyin: wànzi; Cantonese Jyutping: maan^{6}zi^{2}; Japanese: 萬子; rōmaji: wanzu/manzu; lit. 'myriad') is represented by Chinese characters.

The rank of the tile is represented at the top, in blue, with Chinese numerals, while the character below (萬 wàn, meaning myriad) is in red. Older sets used the cursive character 万 when tiles were still hand-carved. Fujianese sets use 品 (pǐn, rank). Most sets use the character 伍 for five instead of 五.

From the monetary origin of this suit, the myriads (10,000) are actually 100 strings of coins described in the bamboo suit section above. One myriad equals ten thousand coins or 100 strings of 100 coins. (1萬=100索×100銅)

==== Red tiles ====
Red tiles (Japanese: 赤牌; rōmaji: akapai) are unique to the Japanese set. They appear as a red version of tiles from each suit and are not quadruplicated. They first appeared in the 1970s with the Red 5 Circle which were followed with red 5 tiles for the other suits. Red 3s and 7s later appeared and were followed by red 1s and 9s although they are much less commonly found in sets than red 5s. There is also a rare red white dragon (白ポッチ, shiro pocchi) which can act as a wild card if tsumo conditions are met.

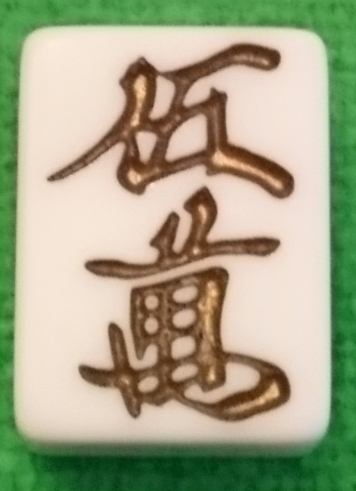
Gold 5 manzu from a Japanese Mahjong parlor

These tiles are entirely optional. When inserted into play, one copy of its regular non-red counterpart is removed. They increase the score when melded. Japanese sets typically do not include the Four Gentlemen flower tiles to make room for the red tiles as flower tiles are rarely used in Japanese Mahjong anyway. Some mahjong parlours will have their own house tiles which may be red tiles for even ranks, even higher-scoring green tiles or gold tiles (Japanese: 金牌; rōmaji: kinpai), or colored wind tiles.

=== Honor tiles ===
Honor tiles (字牌, pinyin: zìpái, Japanese romaji: jihai, meaning 'word tiles'; or 番子, jyutping: faan^{1}zi^{2}, 'exponentials') have neither rank nor suit but like suited tiles they are also formed into melds. They are divided into two categories: four Wind tiles (風牌/风牌, pinyin: fēngpái, jyutping: fung^{1}paai^{2}, Japanese romaji: fompai or kazehai) and three Dragon tiles (三元牌, pinyin: sānyuánpái, jyutping: saam^{1}jyun^{4}paai^{2}, Japanese romaji: sangempai), each of which is quadruplicated. Thus, there are 16 wind tiles and 12 Dragon tiles for 28 honor tiles.

==== Winds ====
The four types of Wind tiles are:

- East (Chinese: 東/东; pinyin: dōng; Cantonese Jyutping: dung^{1}; Japanese: 東; rōmaji: ton),
- South (Chinese and Japanese: 南; pinyin: nán; Cantonese Jyutping: naam^{4}; rōmaji: nan),
- West (Chinese and Japanese: 西; pinyin: xī; Cantonese Jyutping: sai^{1}; rōmaji: shā), and
- North (Chinese and Japanese: 北; pinyin: běi; Cantonese Jyutping: bak^{1}; rōmaji: pei/pē).

Their Chinese characters are usually in blue, like 東, 南, 西 and 北.

Each type of Wind tiles corresponds to a point along the compass, written in blue traditional Chinese characters (even for sets where the Character tiles are written in simplified Chinese). Bonus points are scored if melds match the seat wind or prevailing wind or both. They are also known as the Four Joyous Tiles (Chinese: 四喜牌; pinyin: sìxǐpái; Cantonese Jyutping: sei^{3}hei^{2}paai^{1}).

==== Dragons ====
The three types of Dragon tiles are:

or or

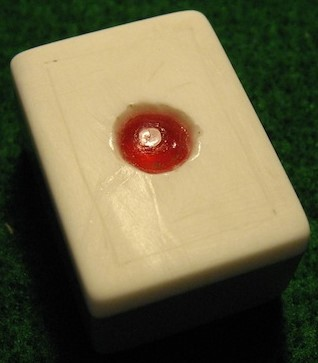
A red white dragon (白ポッチ, shiro pocchi)

- White (Chinese: 白板; pinyin: báibǎn; Cantonese Jyutping: baak^{6}baan^{2}; lit. 'white board'; also Chinese and Japanese: 白; pinyin: bái; Cantonese Jyutping: baak^{6}; rōmaji: haku/shiro) - a tile which can be without any markings like, although most modern sets employ tiles with a blue or black border (like or) to distinguish them from replacement tiles. Anglophone sets may also have a black letter P in the center of the tile, denoting the first letter of the Wade-Giles romanization of 白 (pai). Japanese tiles of this kind have no mark on them, and are occasionally dubbed tofu in some Japanese mahjong clubs. As noted above, there is a Japanese red tile version. Similarly, some American players call this tile "soap" due to its resemblance to bar of soap.
- Green (Chinese: 發財/发财; pinyin: fācái; Cantonese Jyutping: faat^{3}coi^{4}; also Chinese: 青發/青发; pinyin: qīngfā; also Chinese: 發/发; pinyin: fā; Cantonese Jyutping: faat^{3}; Japanese: 發/𤼵; rōmaji: hatsu) - a tile with a green traditional Chinese character (發), even for sets where the Character tiles are written in simplified Chinese. Often the variant character U+24F35 𤼵 (Some sets have 弓矢, some 弓殳, some 子殳, and some 子矢, although the latter two are rare) is used. It is a contraction of 發財/发财 (pinyin: fā cái) which loosely means "to strike it rich"). Some sets, notably American, use a green dragon in place of the character or may also have a black letter F in a corner of the tile, denoting the first letter from its transliteration. This tile was absent in the earliest sets. Some tiles have the traditional Chinese character "鳳" or a green dragon icon.
- Red (Chinese: 紅中/红中; pinyin: hóngzhōng; Cantonese Jyutping: hung^{4}zung^{1}; also Chinese and Japanese: 中; pinyin: zhōng; Cantonese Jyutping: zung^{1}; rōmaji: chun) - a tile with a red traditional Chinese character (中) meaning center or middle. Sets for English speakers may also have a black letter C in a corner of the tile, denoting the first letter of the Wade-Giles romanization of 中 (chung). One of the earliest sets did not include these tiles. Some tiles have the traditional Chinese character "龍" or a red dragon icon.

The Chinese name for the Dragon tiles means "three fundamental tiles" (三元牌). They are also known as the arrow tiles (箭牌). The English name ("Dragons") was an invention by Babcock. In English, they are sometimes referred to as "cardinal tiles". This term should not be confused with the winds which are labeled with the cardinal directions, but are never referred to as "cardinal tiles".

They are like wind tiles except melding them will always score bonus points regardless of the prevailing or seat wind. These tiles were invented after the wind tiles beginning with the whites which were developed from replacement tiles, followed by the reds circa 1870, and finally the greens which entered the set by 1890. Chinese characters occur in the design of the Characters, the Winds and the Dragons. Regular script (楷書) is usually used in the areas of Hong Kong, Taiwan, Canton, China and Southeast Asia, while Semi-cursive script (行書) is usually used in Japan.

Chinese characters on Mahjong tiles. Regular script on top, semi-cursive script at the bottom.

=== Flower tiles ===
Flower tiles (Chinese and Japanese: 花牌; pinyin: huāpái; Cantonese Jyutping: faa^{1}paai^{2}; rōmaji: hanahai/fapai) are not used in melds. When drawn, they are set aside and the player gets to draw again but from the dead wall. These tiles usually depict stylized representations of flowers in many colors (hence the name). Nevertheless, other non-floral themes also exist, which vary from set to set. In American Mahjong, they are treated as honor tiles but from the 1930s to 1960 they were considered jokers. Some Japanese players treat them as higher scoring honors that cannot be used to form 'eyes' (pairs). Generally, however, they are not used in Japanese mahjong.

==== Quartets ====
The average set, if it contains flower tiles, will have two quartets of flower tiles, differentiating the color and/or style of the labels. Each quartet contains four unique tiles, which are numbered from 1 to 4 or otherwise distinctly labelled (common Chinese sets will have one quartet with blue Arabic numerals and the other group having red Chinese numerals). Each number matches a seat (1=East, 2=South, 3=West, 4=North). Winners can double their score if the number on their flowers matches their seat number. There are also bonuses from collecting an entire quartet and in some variations, immediately winning from collecting all the flowers. As they reward points for pure luck, many games do not include them or are considered optional.

The four tiles in the Four Seasons (Chinese: 四季; pinyin: sìjì; Cantonese Jyutping: sei^{3}gwai^{3}; Japanese: 季節牌; rōmaji: kisetsuhai; Vietnamese: bốn mùa) quartet are:

or or

1. Spring (Chinese: 春; pinyin: chūn; Cantonese Jyutping: ceon^{1}; Vietnamese: xuân)
2. Summer (Chinese: 夏; pinyin: xià; Cantonese Jyutping: haa^{6}; Vietnamese: hạ)
3. Autumn (Chinese: 秋; pinyin: qiū; Cantonese Jyutping: cau^{1}; Vietnamese: thu)
4. Winter (Chinese: 冬; pinyin: dōng; Cantonese Jyutping: dung^{1}; Vietnamese: đông)

The representative patterns of the four seasons tiles are not fixed. The more common ones are "spring" with various spring flowers, such as peonies, or multiple blooming flowers; "summer" with lotus; "autumn" with autumn fruits; and "winter" with daffodils.

The four tiles in the Four Gentlemen (Chinese: 四君子; pinyin: sìjūnzi; Cantonese Jyutping: sei^{3}gwan^{1}zi^{2}; Vietnamese: Tứ Quân Tử) quartet are:

or or

1. Plum (Chinese: 梅; pinyin: méi; Cantonese Jyutping: mui^{4}; Vietnamese: mai)
2. Orchid (Chinese: 蘭; pinyin: lán; Cantonese Jyutping: laan^{4}; Vietnamese: lan)
3. Chrysanthemum (Chinese: 菊; pinyin: jú; Cantonese Jyutping: guk^{1}; Vietnamese: cúc)
4. Bamboo (Chinese: 竹; pinyin: zhú; Cantonese Jyutping: zuk^{1}; Vietnamese: trúc)

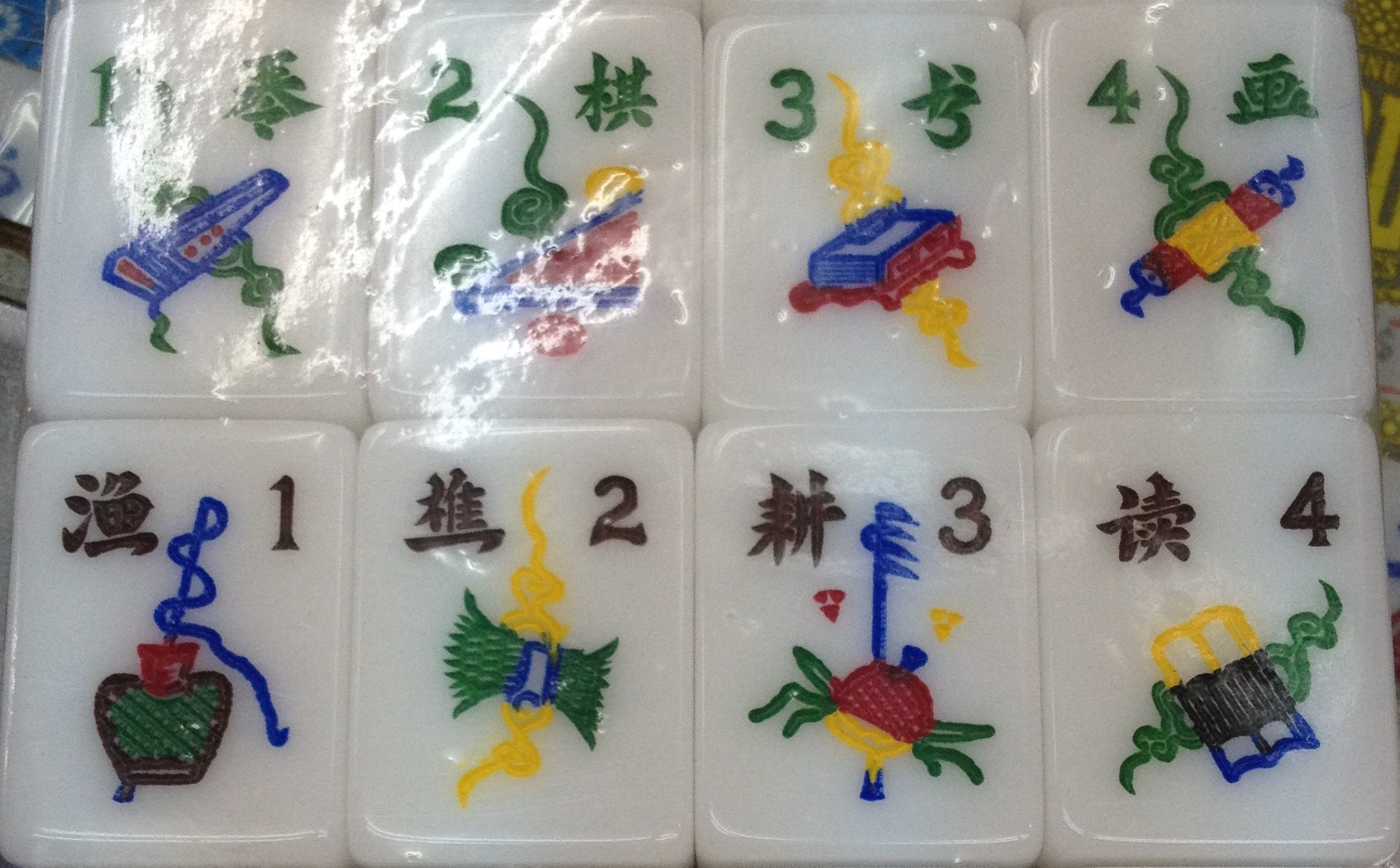
Four Arts on the top, Four Noble Professions on the bottom

Vietnamese and Malaysian mahjong sets contain two more quartets of flower tiles in addition to the Four Seasons and Four Gentlemen. These are the usual subjects:

- Four Arts (Chinese: 四藝; pinyin: sìyì; Cantonese Jyutping: sei^{3}ngai^{6}; Vietnamese: Tứ Nghệ):

1. Guqin (Chinese: 琴; pinyin: qín)
2. Go (Chinese: 棋; pinyin: qí)
3. Calligraphy (Chinese: 書; pinyin: shū)
4. Painting (Chinese: 畫; pinyin: huà)
- Four Noble Professions (Chinese: 四業; pinyin: sìyè; Cantonese Jyutping: sei^{3}jip^{6}; Vietnamese: Tứ nghiệp):

1. Fisherman (Chinese: 漁; pinyin: yú): a fishing pole behind a fishing basket
2. Woodcutter (Chinese: 樵; pinyin: qiáo): a tied up bundle of wood
3. Farmer (Chinese: 耕; pinyin: gēng): a rake behind a hat
4. Scholar (Chinese: 讀; pinyin: dú): a book or scroll

While some Vietnamese sets use the Four Arts and the Four Noble Professions, most of them use emperors (Chinese: 皇; pinyin: huáng; Cantonese Jyutping: wong^{4}; Vietnamese: hoàng) and empresses (Chinese: 后; pinyin: hòu; Cantonese Jyutping: hau^{6}; Vietnamese: hậu). They are not decorated with pictures but just the number and character (e.g. Third Emperor 三皇, Fourth Empress 四后).

The earliest known Chinese sets contained twelve flowers but no Four Gentlemen tiles and the Four Seasons were unadorned. Sets with large numbers of flowers were once popular in Northern China to play the game of "Flower Mahjong" (花麻雀). They typically had 20 or more flowers with some described as having up to 44.

Between 1943 and 1971, American mahjong sets experimented with the number of flower and joker tiles. During that period, the number of flower tiles range from six tiles to as many as 24 tiles, before settling to eight. For modern American sets, the first quartet is the four seasons, and the second quartet is the "Three Stars" (Chinese: 三星; pinyin: sān xīng) and "Nobility."

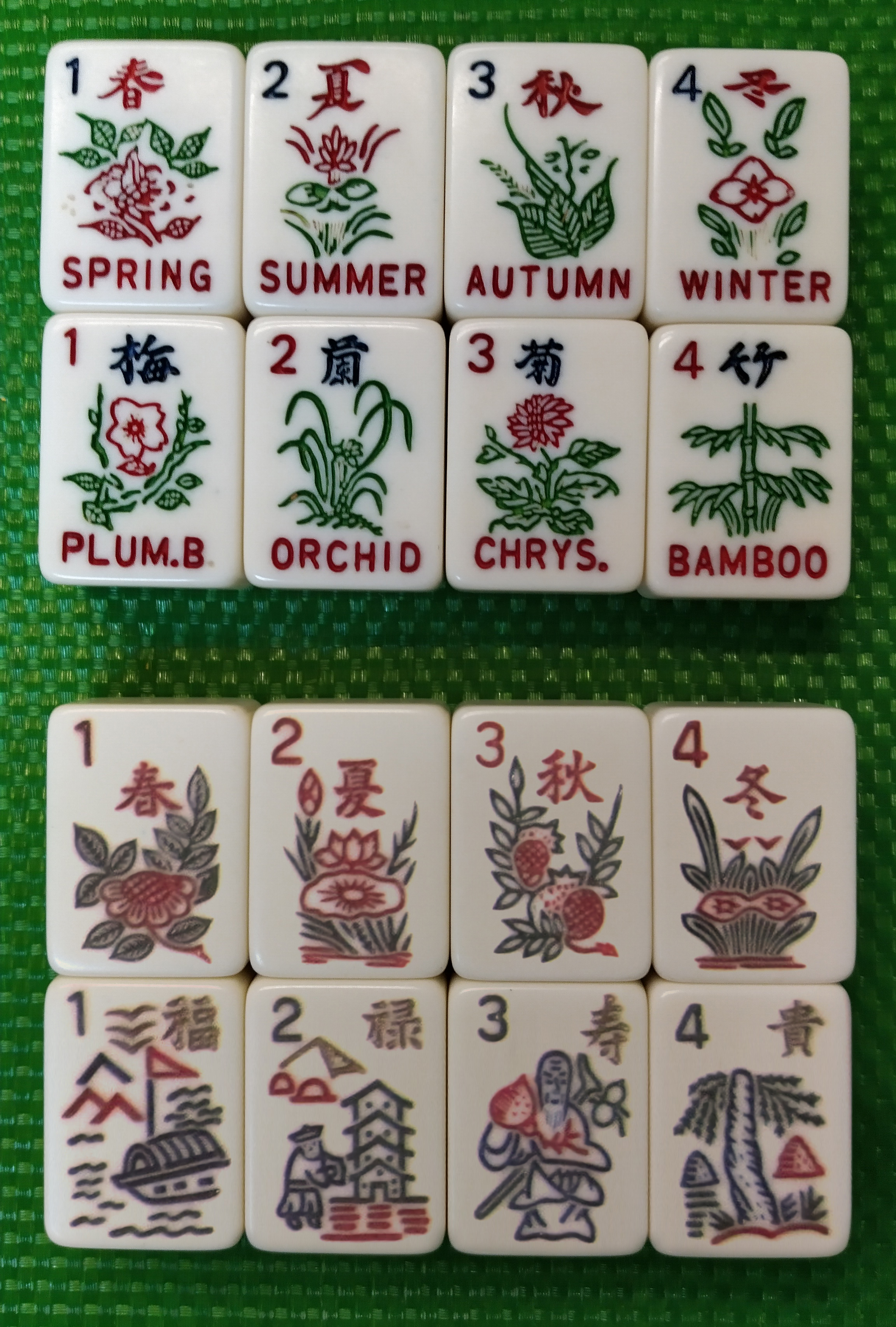
1. Spring
2. Summer
3. Autumn
4. Winter
1. Fortune (Chinese: 福; pinyin: fú): a boat at the mercy of the sea
2. Prosperity (Chinese: 禄; pinyin: lù): a nicely dressed man next to a pagoda
3. Longevity (Chinese: 寿; pinyin: shòu): the Old Man of the South Pole holding a Peach of Immortality
4. Nobility (Chinese: 貴; pinyin: guì): a cypress tree

==== Animal tiles ====
Animal tiles (Chinese: 動物牌/动物牌; pinyin: dòngwùpái; Cantonese Jyutping: dung^{6}mat^{6}paai^{2}) are unnumbered flowers that automatically match the player's seat. These tiles are found in pairs with their subjects usually based on popular Chinese fables. Immediate payment may occur if both tiles in a pair or all the animals are collected. Singaporean sets contain two pairs of animal tiles while four-player Malaysian sets have four pairs. Some examples of tile pairs include:

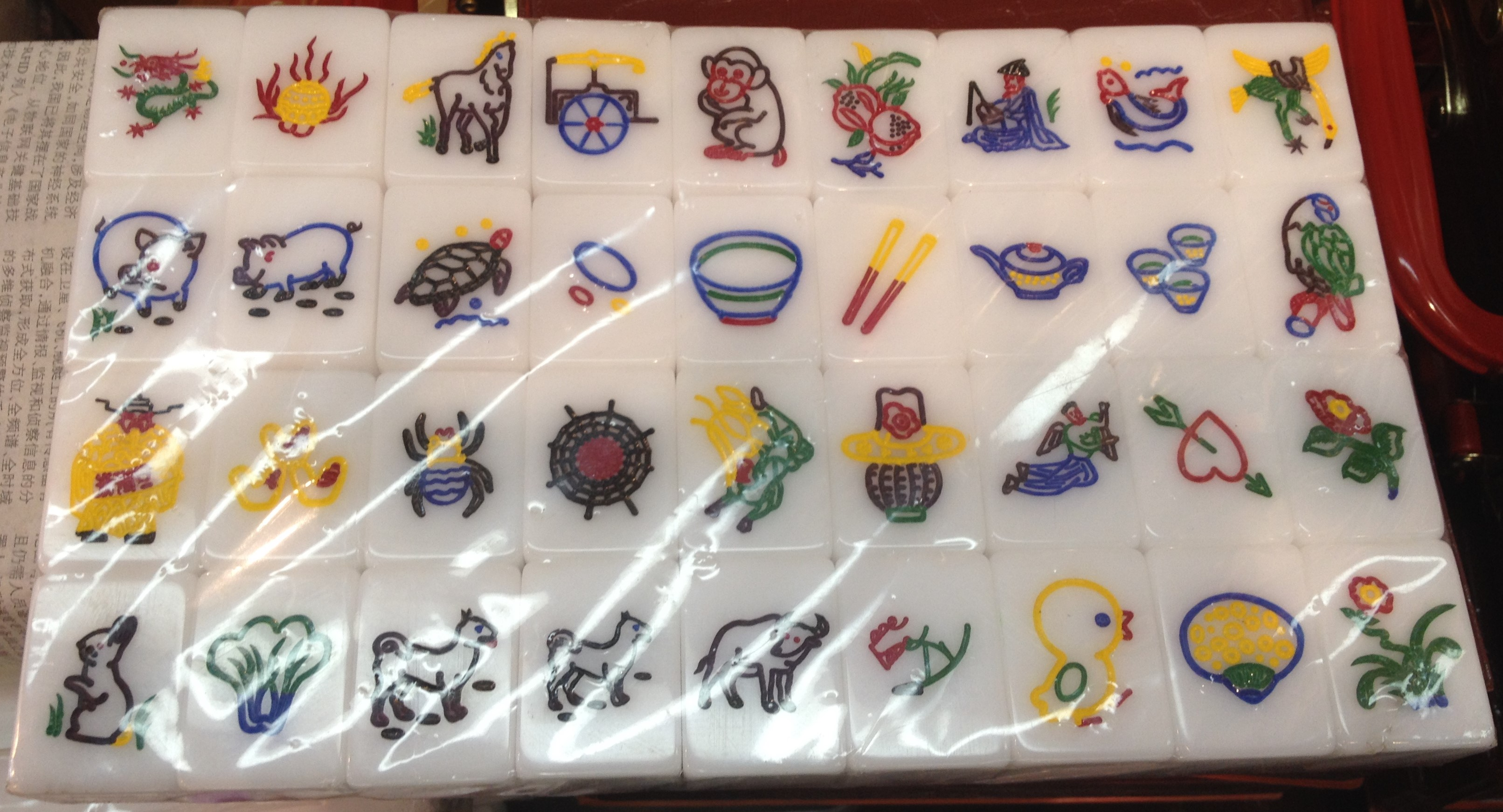
Various animal tiles (from top-left to bottom-right: dragon, flaming pearl, horse, rickshaw, monkey, fruit, Jiang Ziya, fish, crane, pig, second pig, turtle, turtle egg, bowl, chopsticks, tea pot, tea cups, bird, Caishen or Liu Haichan, sycee, spider, spider web, Jin Chan, Liu Haichan's pot of gold, cupid, arrow through heart, flower, rabbit, cabbage, dog, second dog, ox, plough, chick, chicken egg, second flower)

- Cat (Chinese: 貓/猫; pinyin: māo; Cantonese Jyutping: maau^{1}) & Mouse (Chinese: 老鼠; pinyin: láoshǔ; Cantonese Jyutping: lou^{5}syu^{2})
- Rooster (Chinese: 公雞/公鸡; pinyin: gōngjī; Cantonese Jyutping: gung^{1}gai^{1}) & Centipede (Chinese: 蜈蚣; pinyin: wúgōng; Cantonese Jyutping: ng^{4}gung^{1})
- Caishen (the god of wealth in Chinese folk religion and Taoism) & Sycee (an ancient, custom-made gold or silver ingot)
- Jiang Ziya (an 11th-century BC military strategist who, according to legend, fished without bait, believing the fish would come on their own) & Fish
- Liu Haichan (a legendary Taoist immortal) & Jin Chan (a mythical three-legged toad that attracts wealth)
- Dragon & Flaming pearl (a legendary treasure said to grant wishes)
- Hou Yi (an archer) & Three-legged crow with an arrow through it. Some modern sets as seen in the image above use cupid & heart to be more kid-friendly.

Three-player Malaysian sets have two pairs of animals accompanied with a quartet of identical animal tiles decorated with a face, usually that of a clown. These are known as heads (人头), faces (人臉), clowns (小丑) or snowmen (雪人). Sometimes, these four heads will be replaced with a pair of male heads (male clowns, male faces) and a pair of female heads (female clowns, female faces).

or

=== Joker tiles ===
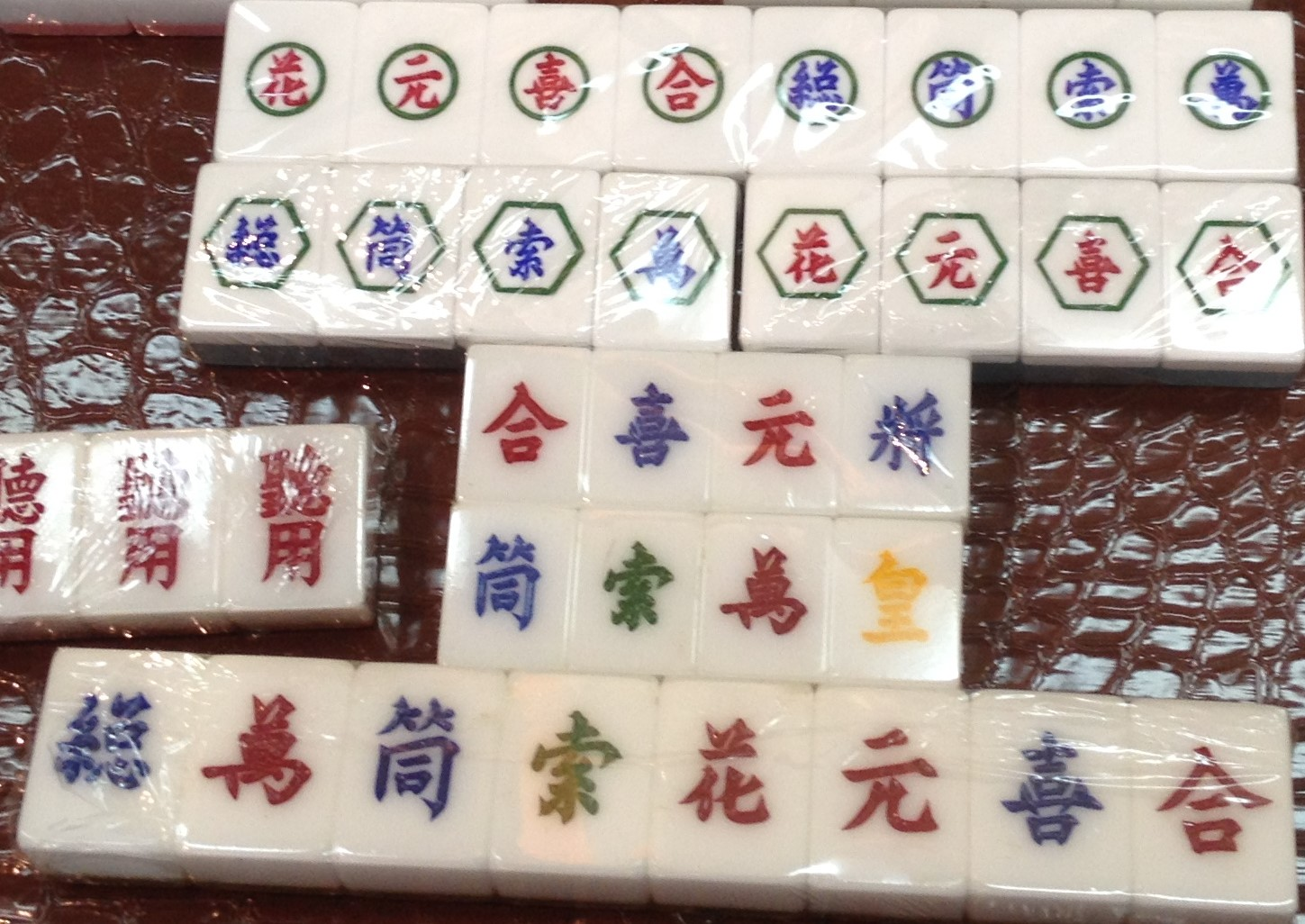
Various joker tiles

Joker tiles (百搭牌, pinyin bǎidāpái) can be used to replace any suited or honor tile in putting together a hand subject to local restrictions. Four jokers are sometimes used in certain variants of Southeast Asian and Chinese mahjong, including Shanghainese mahjong. American mahjong uses eight jokers.

==== General-purpose ====
All-purpose jokers may have these inscriptions: 百搭 (bǎidā, 'hundred uses'), 聽用 (tīngyòng, 'many uses'), 飛 (fēi, 'flying'), or simply "Joker" in American sets.

or or or

==== Suit-restricted ====
Vietnamese mahjong is related to extinct Chinese variants which used specialized jokers such as "King Mahjong" (王麻雀). Vietnamese mahjong sets commonly contain eight unique jokers:

- Blue/green jokers (khung xanh):
  - Circle joker (筒, thùng)
  - Bamboo joker (索, soọc)
  - Character joker (萬, màn)
  - Universal joker (縂, tổng) : In King Mahjong it is a Suit and Honor joker, in Vietnamese mahjong it can also be used like the flower joker. Hong Kongers may use the 皇 character but this is not found in Vietnam because a flower quartet also uses it (see above).
    or
- Red jokers (khung đỏ):
  - Suit joker (合, hợp)
  - Dragon joker (元, nguyên)
  - Wind joker (喜, hỷ)
  - Flower joker (花, hoa) : Like an animal tile but scores two doubles; it replaced the King Mahjong joker that functioned as a second Suit and Honor joker (陞王).
    - Honor joker (番 or 字 or 元喜, nhị khẩu) : A newer Vietnamese tile, it is an alternative to the dragon or wind joker. In Hong Kong, it is an alternative to the flower joker.

The first four jokers have a long lineage. They are found in the earliest sets and were inspired by the suit-restricted jokers in older Chinese card games. After 1975, modern Vietnamese sets triplicated or quadruplicated all eight jokers but each copy will have a different frame (rectangle, circle, lozenge, and hexagon) which allows them to be melded with each other. This means a total of 32 jokers, 36 if the alternate honor jokers are also included.

==== Rank-restricted ====
Assorted joker tiles from Hong Kong: 么, 兵, 卒, 仕, 合, 喜, 元, 將

In Hong Kong, Vietnamese style sets may also contain rank-restricted jokers, either as alternatives to the flower joker, or in addition to the usual eight:

- Terminal joker (么, jyutping: jiu^{1}, 'ace') : Replaces one or nine of any suit
- 147 joker (仕, si^{6}) : Replaces one, four, or seven of any suit
- 258 joker (將, zoeng^{3}) : Replaces two, five, or eight of any suit
- 369 joker (兵, bing^{1} or 卒, zeot^{1}) : Replaces three, six, or nine of any suit
  or

The Chinese characters from the latter three comes from Xiangqi pieces. These sets may have suit, dragon, wind, and rank-restricted jokers adorned with multiple characters representing the tiles they can replace, instead of a single Chinese character.

== Comparison ==
Mahjong Variations
Variation	Hong Kong	Sichuan	Japanese	Japanese 3 Player	Korean 3 Player	Singapore	Malaysian 4 Player	Malaysian 3 Player	Vietnam	American
Dots	9 types × 4 tiles	9 types × 4 tiles	9 types × 4 tiles	9 types × 4 tiles	9 types × 4 tiles	9 types × 4 tiles	9 types × 4 tiles	9 types × 4 tiles	9 types × 4 tiles	9 types × 4 tiles
Bamboo	9 types × 4 tiles	9 types × 4 tiles	9 types × 4 tiles	9 types × 4 tiles	2 types (Note: Only 1 bamboo and 9 bamboo are used.) × 4 tiles	9 types × 4 tiles	9 types × 4 tiles	—N/a	9 types × 4 tiles	9 types × 4 tiles
Characters	9 types × 4 tiles	9 types × 4 tiles	9 types × 4 tiles	2 types (Note: Only 1 character and 9 character are used.) × 4 tiles	9 types × 4 tiles	9 types × 4 tiles	9 types × 4 tiles	—N/a	9 types × 4 tiles	9 types × 4 tiles
Winds	4 types × 4 tiles	—N/a	4 types × 4 tiles	4 types × 4 tiles	3 types (Note: Only East, South and West are used.) × 4 tiles	4 types × 4 tiles	4 types × 4 tiles	4 types × 4 tiles	4 types × 4 tiles	4 types × 4 tiles
Dragons	3 types × 4 tiles	—N/a	3 types × 4 tiles	3 types × 4 tiles	3 types × 4 tiles	3 types × 4 tiles	3 types × 4 tiles	3 types × 4 tiles	3 types × 4 tiles	3 types × 4 tiles
Four Flowers	4 types × 1 tile	—N/a	—N/a	—N/a	4 types × 1 tile	4 types × 1 tile	4 types × 1 tile	4 types × 1 tile	4 types × 1 tile	4 types × 1 tile
Four Seasons	4 types × 1 tile	—N/a	—N/a	—N/a	—N/a (Note: Do not use usually.)	4 types × 1 tile	4 types × 1 tile	4 types × 1 tile	4 types × 1 tile	4 types × 1 tile
Four Arts	—N/a	—N/a	—N/a	—N/a	—N/a	—N/a	4 types × 1 tile	—N/a	—N/a	—N/a
Four Professions	—N/a	—N/a	—N/a	—N/a	—N/a	—N/a	4 types × 1 tile	—N/a	—N/a	—N/a
Four Emperors	—N/a	—N/a	—N/a	—N/a	—N/a	—N/a	—N/a	—N/a	4 types × 1 tile	—N/a
Four Empresses	—N/a	—N/a	—N/a	—N/a	—N/a	—N/a	—N/a	—N/a	4 types × 1 tile	—N/a
Normal Animal tiles	—N/a	—N/a	—N/a	—N/a	—N/a	4 types × 1 tile	4 types × 1 tile	4 types × 1 tile	—N/a	—N/a
Faces tiles	—N/a	—N/a	—N/a	—N/a	—N/a	2 types × 2 tiles (Note: Also 1 type × 4 tiles can be used.)	2 types × 2 tiles	2 types × 2 tiles	—N/a	—N/a
Joker tiles	—N/a	—N/a	—N/a	—N/a	—N/a	1 type × 4 tiles (Note: Do not use sometimes.)	1 type × 4 tiles	1 type × 4 tiles	8 types × 1 tile	1 type × 8 tiles
Total	144	108	136	108	108	156	164	84	160	152

=== Regional design ===
Designs of mahjong tiles are different between regions. Here are some examples.

Styles from different regions
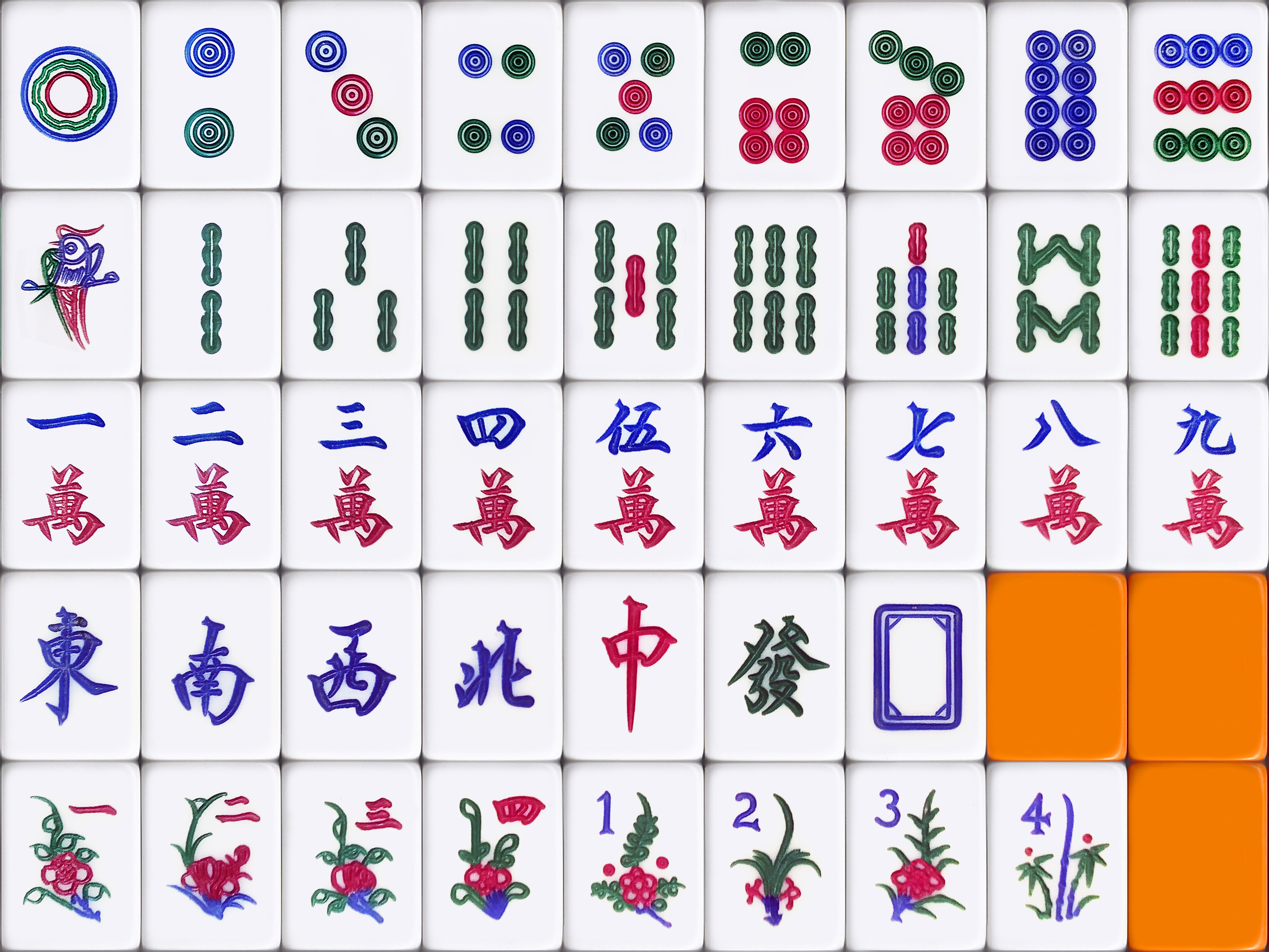
Hong Kong style. A coloured sparrow is drawn on the one bamboo. Only the numbers marked on the flower tiles. The Chinese characters are in regular script.

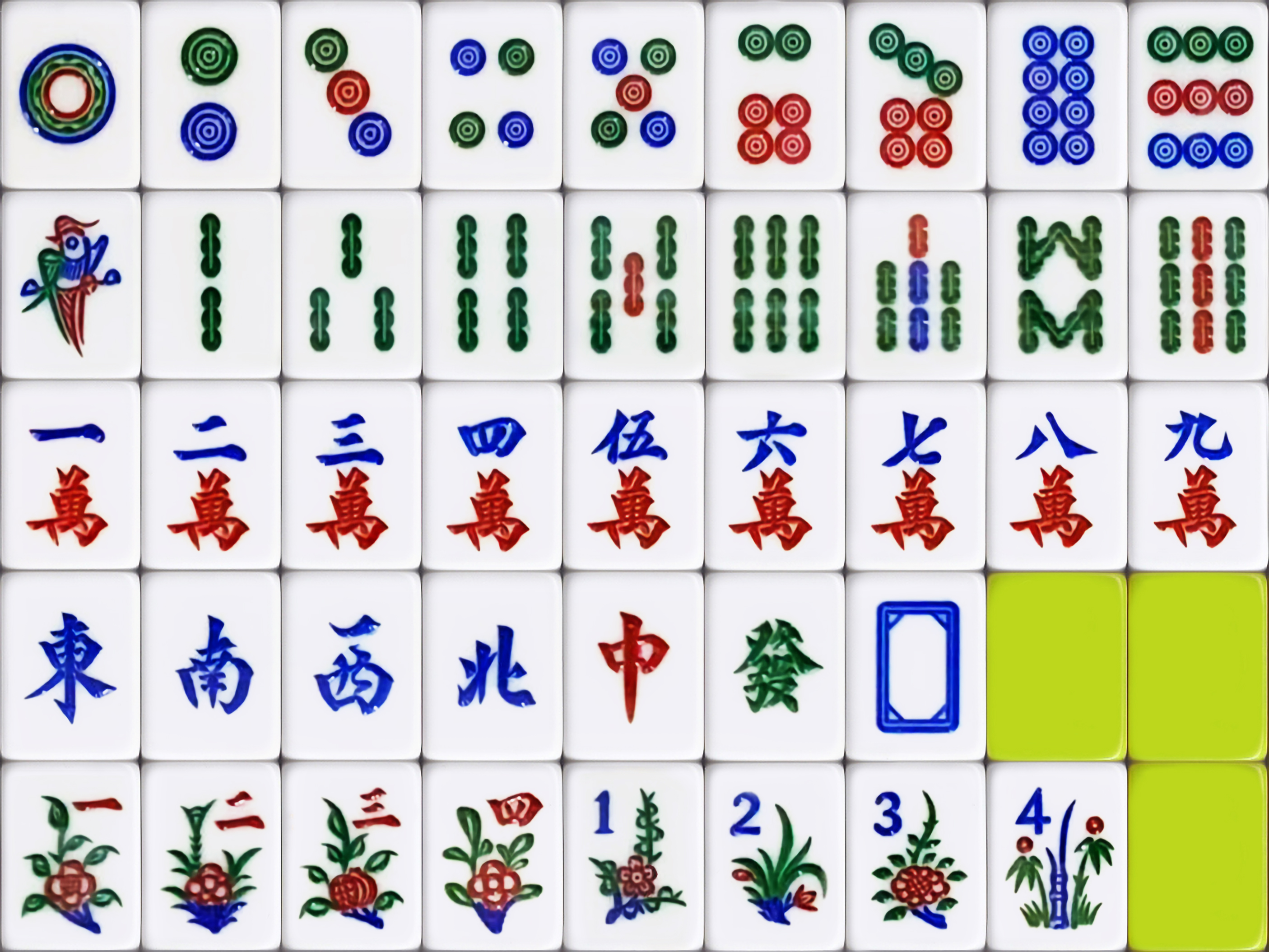
Canton style, similar to the Hong Kong tiles.

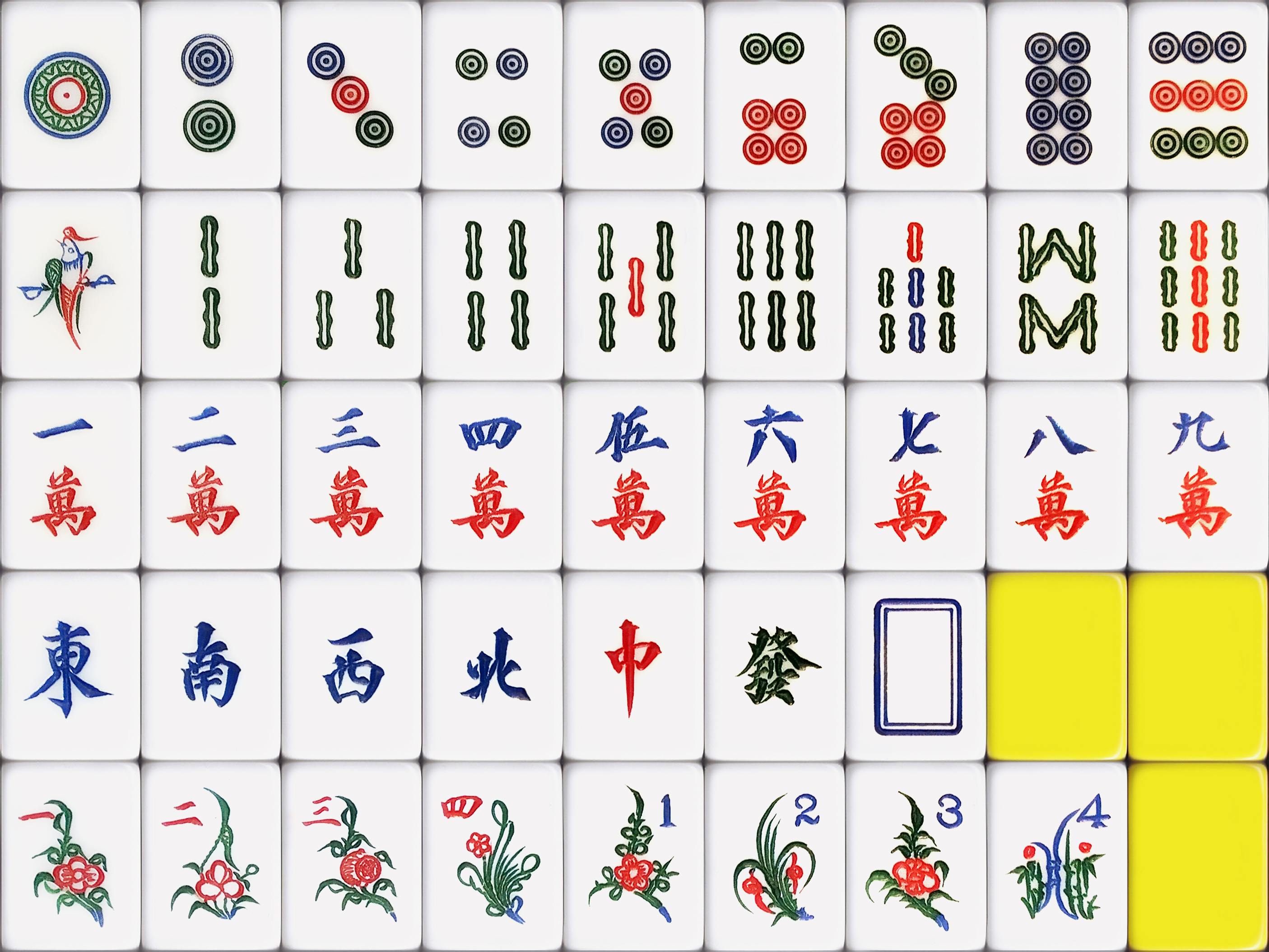
Hand carving tiles in Canton, the bird of one bamboo reflecting the carver's skill.

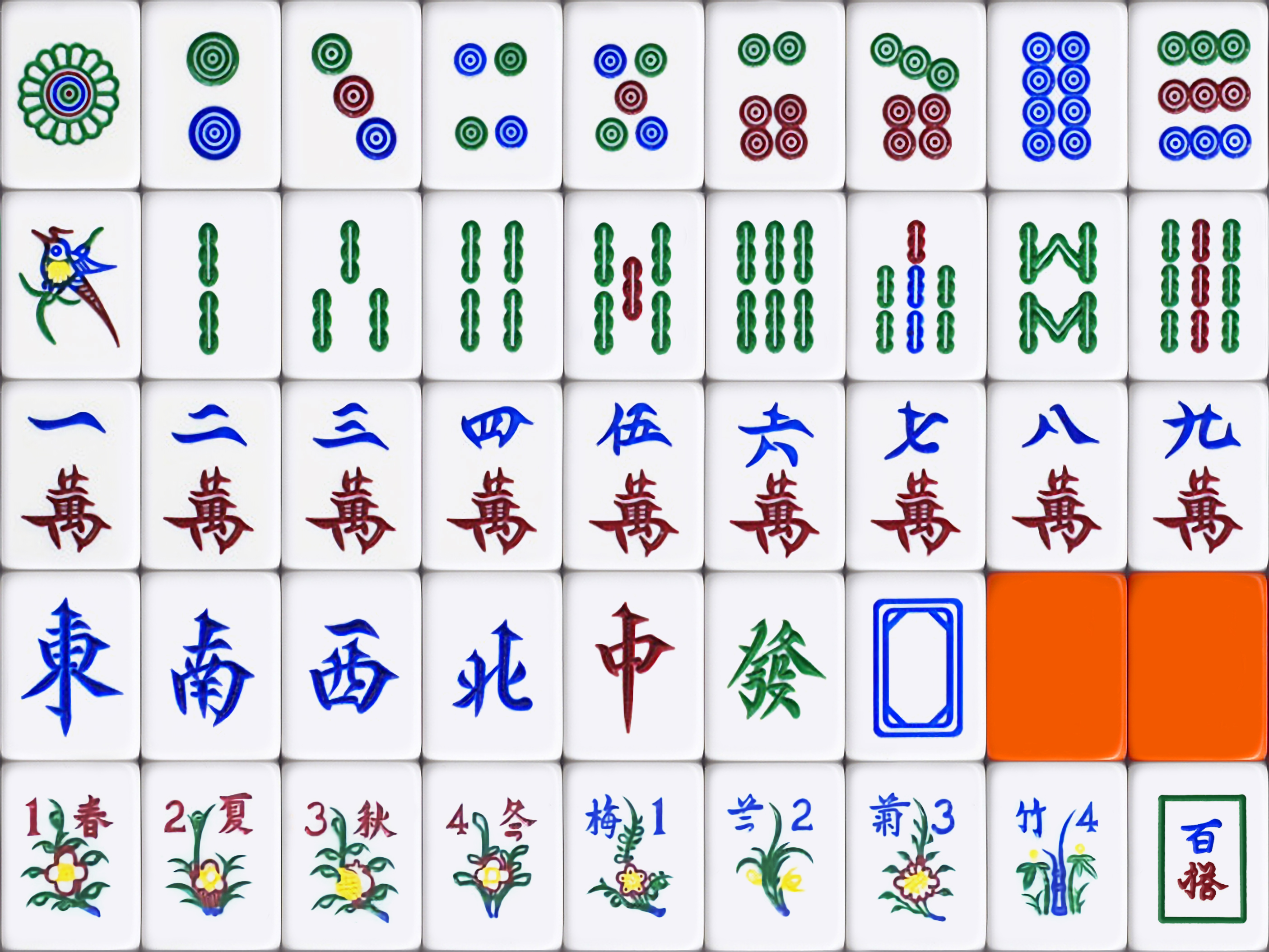
Macau style, similar to the Hong Kong tiles but the bird of one bamboo is different. Joker tiles are present. Both numbers and Chinese characters are marked on the flower tiles.

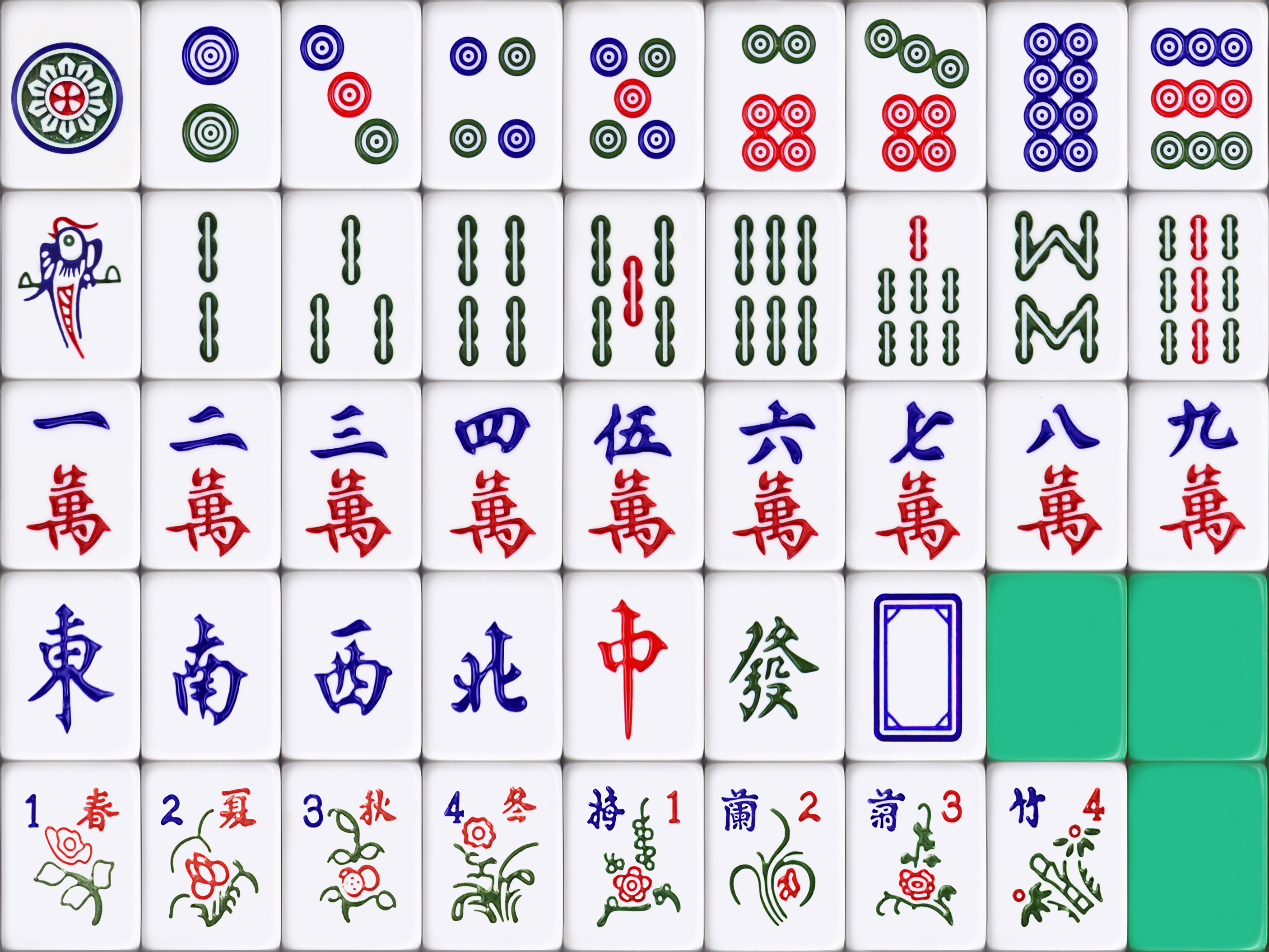
Ningbo style, patterns and colours are similar to the Canton tiles.

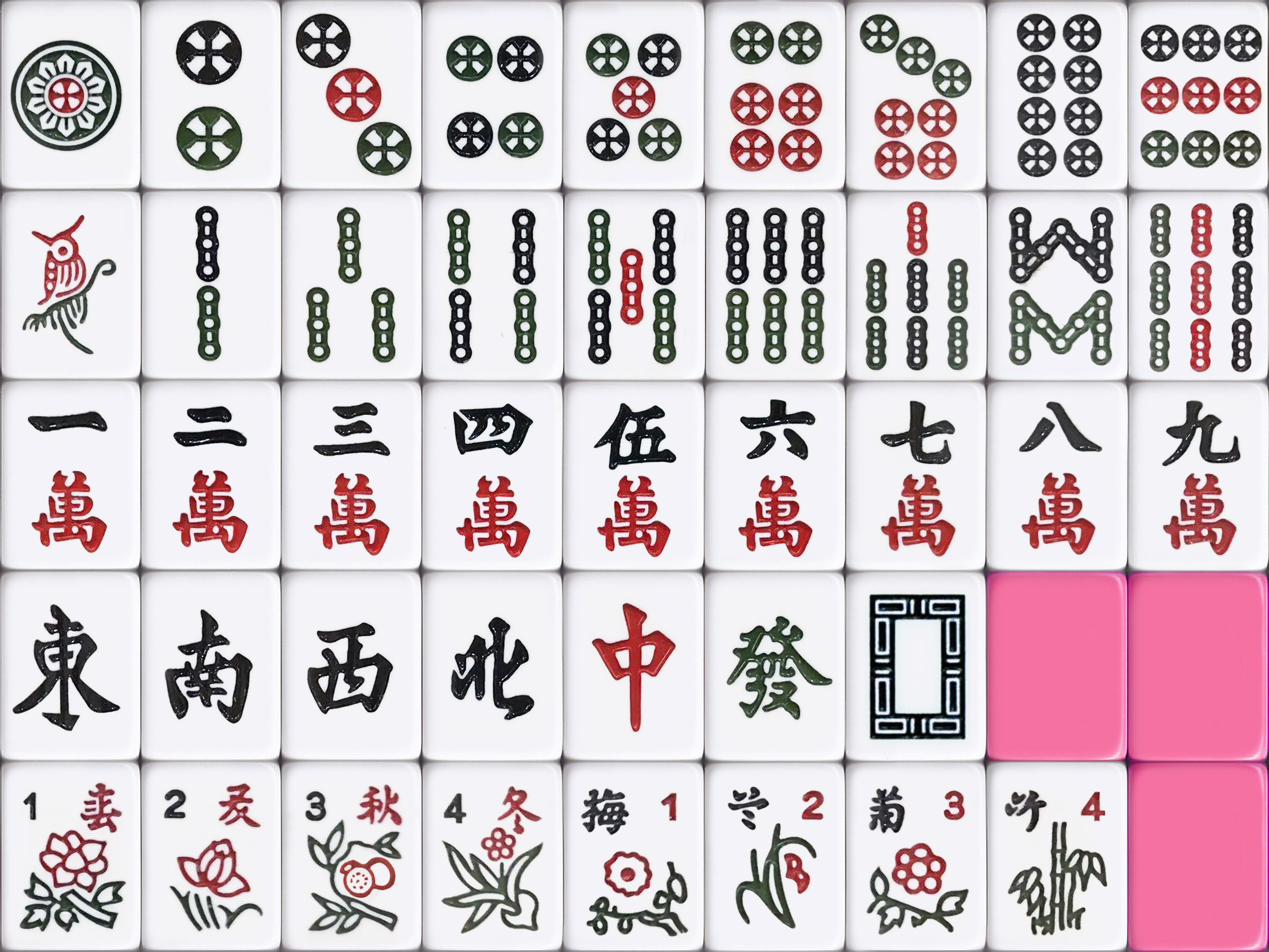
Taiwan style. The lines of the one bamboo are simpler, black paint is used instead of blue, and the Chinese characters are angular.

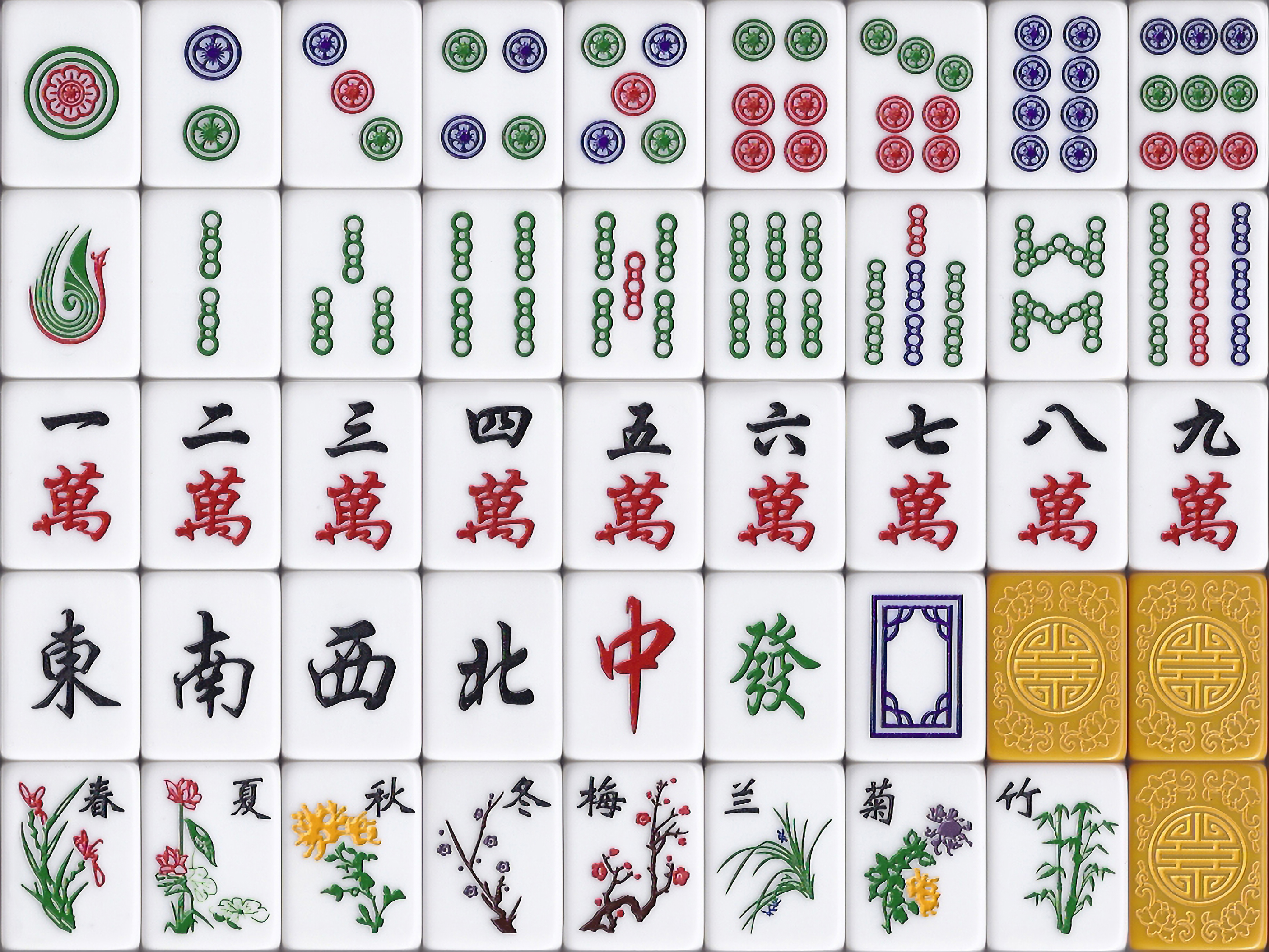
Chongqing style, made for the 3rd World Mahjong Championship in 2012. The colours are brighter, Character "五" (not "伍") is used for the 5 Character.

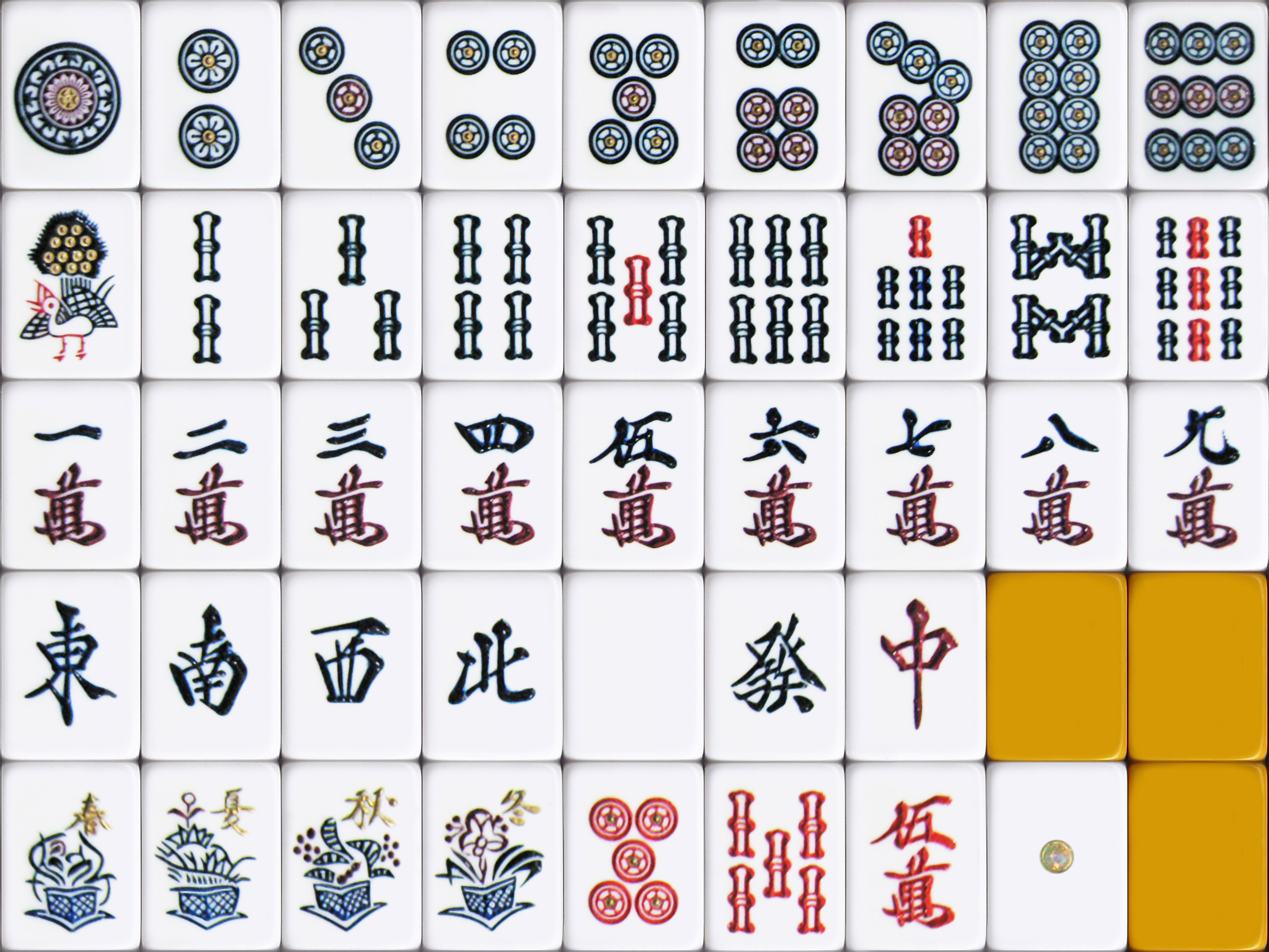
Japan style. Peacock is drawn on the one bamboo. Only 4 flower tiles. Red five tiles and dora white dragon are present. The Chinese characters are in Kansai script. Colours are darker than Canton tiles.

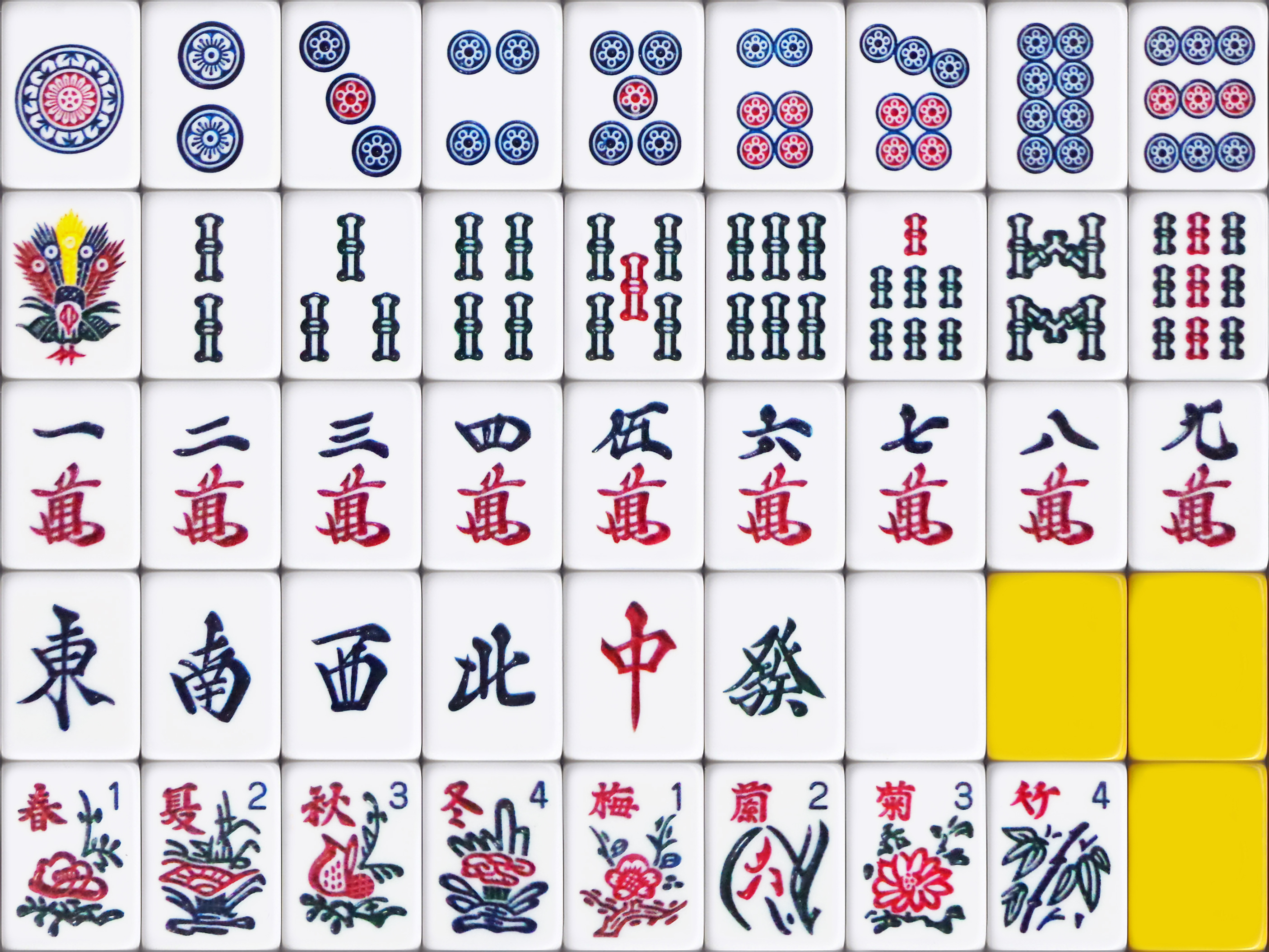
Japan style with 8 flower tiles, which can be used for the rules in Hong Kong and Taiwan. The peacock on the one bamboo is more colourful. Colours on tiles are brighter than the left one.

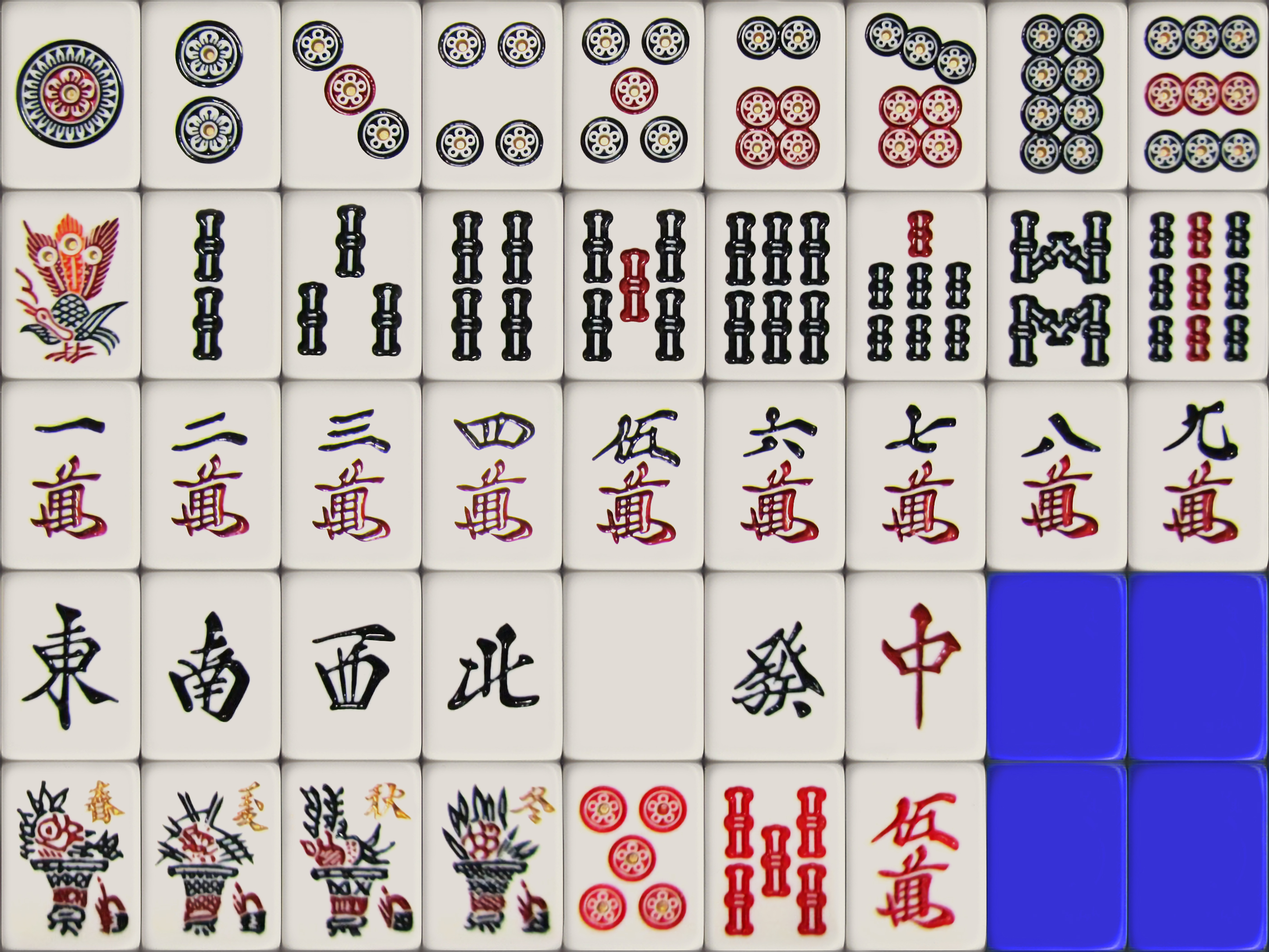
Another Japan style with a different peacock pattern on the one bamboo. 4 season tiles and red five tiles are present.

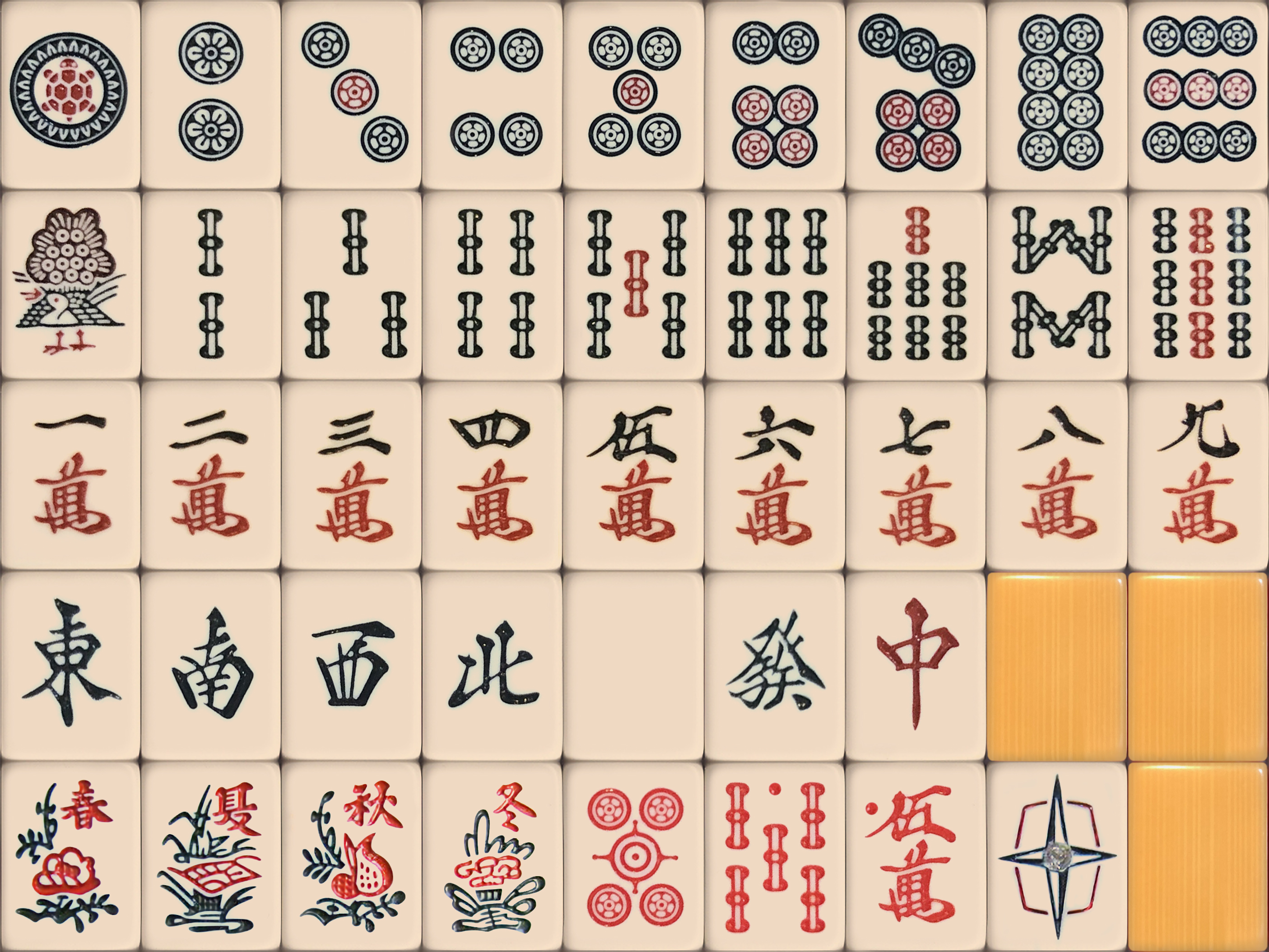
Another Japan style, no different when we turn the bamboos upside down. There is a blind spot on the red five tiles. The dora white dragon is designed as Kyūshū style. Made by Nintendo, the 1 circles features a subtle turtle design, and the red 5 circles a crosshair design. 8 flower tiles version is present.

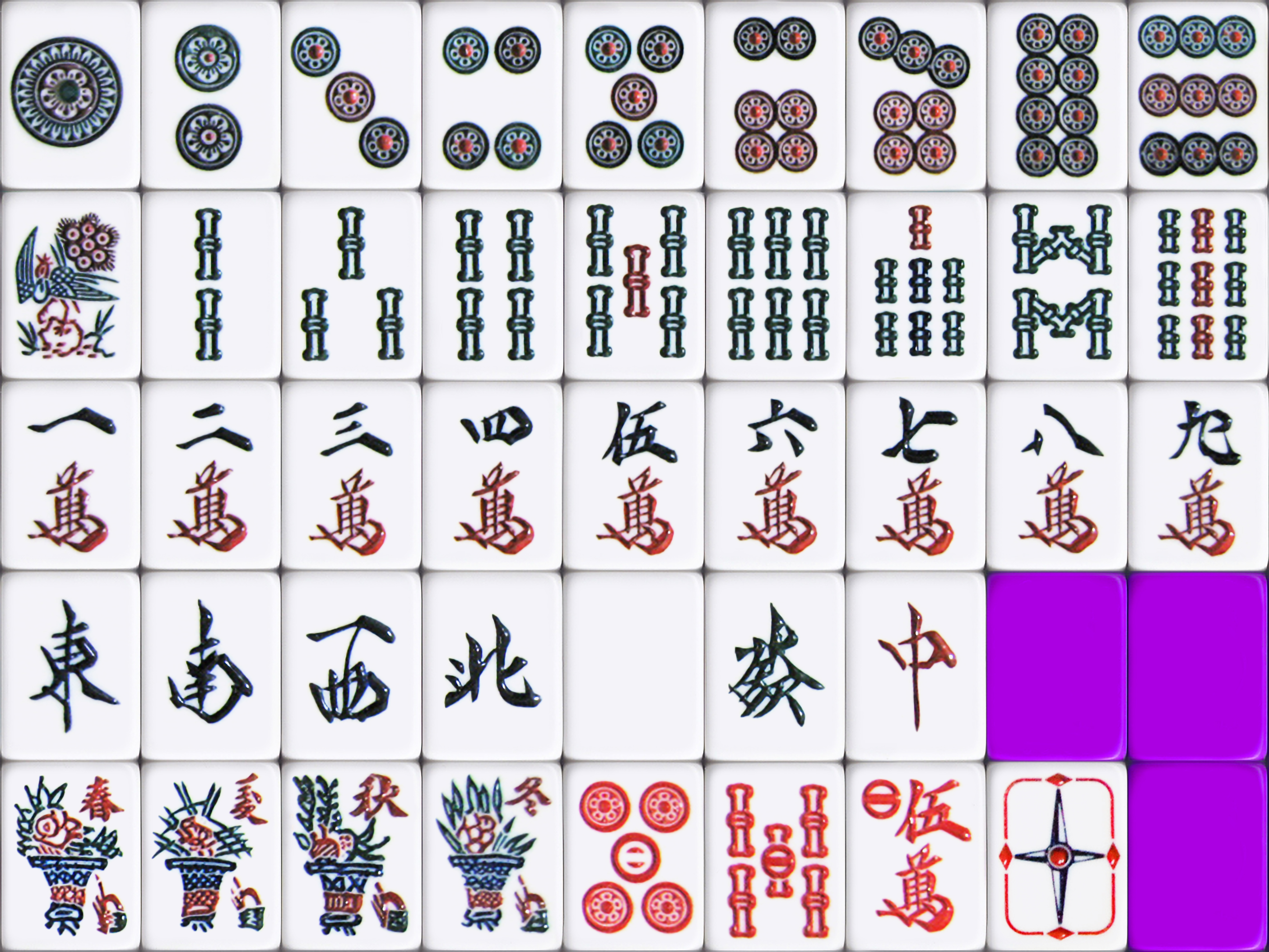
Japan style which the Chinese characters are in Kantō script. Red five tiles are present. The dora white dragon is designed as Kyūshū style.

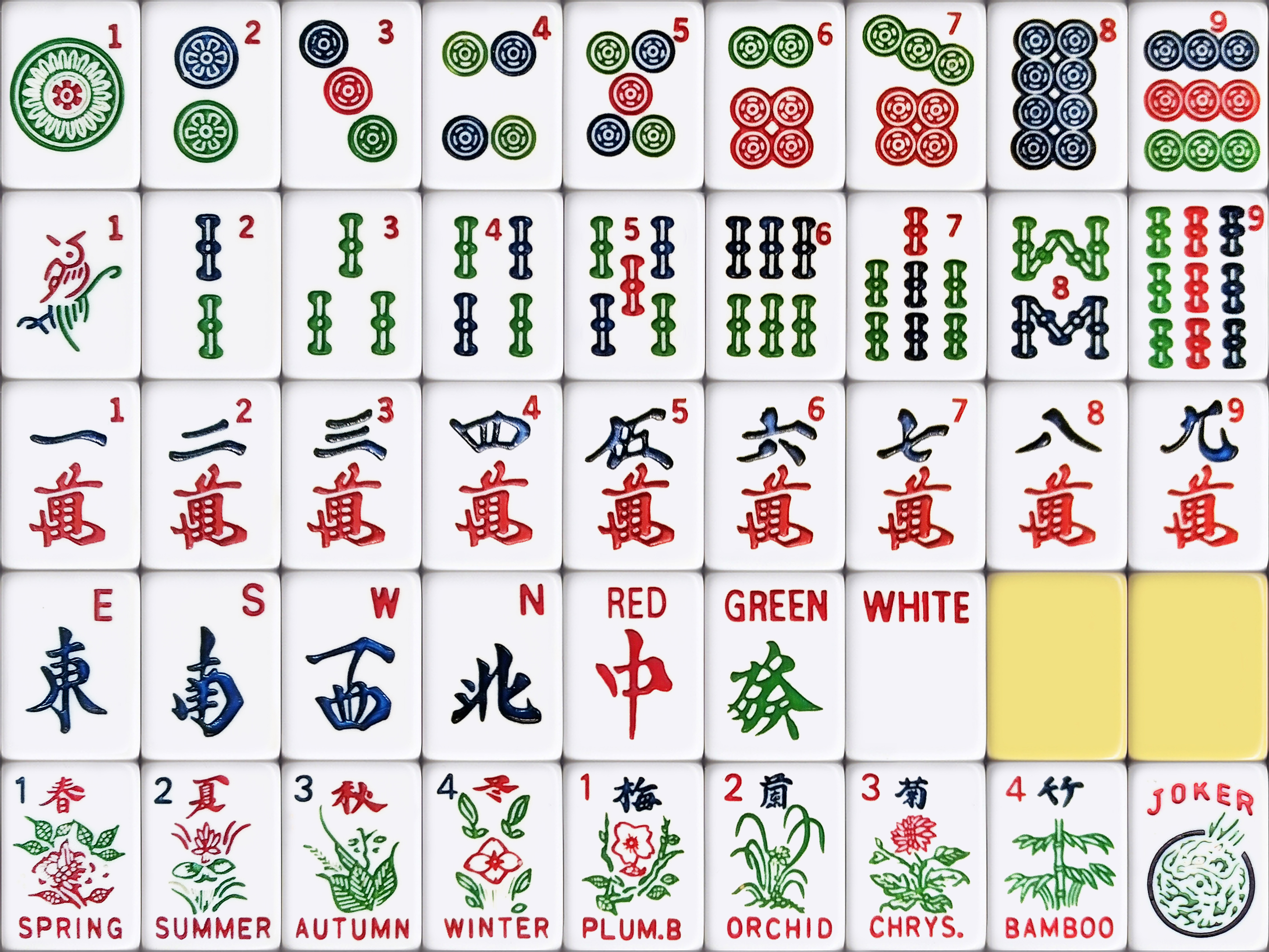
Europe style. Arabic numbers, letters or english words are marked for western players. Joker tiles are present.

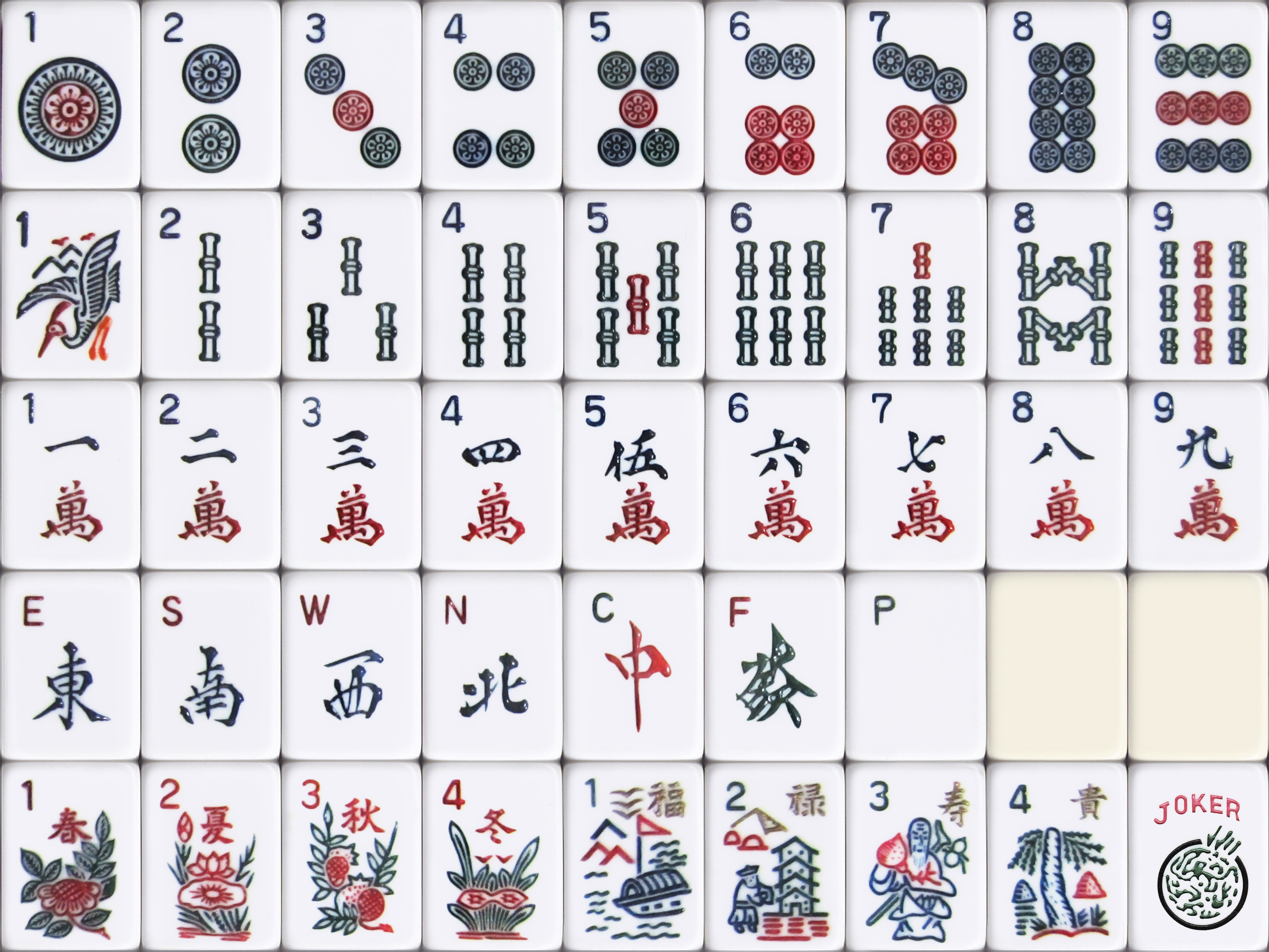
America style. Numbers or letters are marked in a different position than Europe style. Joker tiles are present. "Plum blossom, Orchid, Chrysanthemum, Bamboo" are replaced by "福 Fortune; 禄 Prosperity, 寿 Longevity, 貴 Nobility".

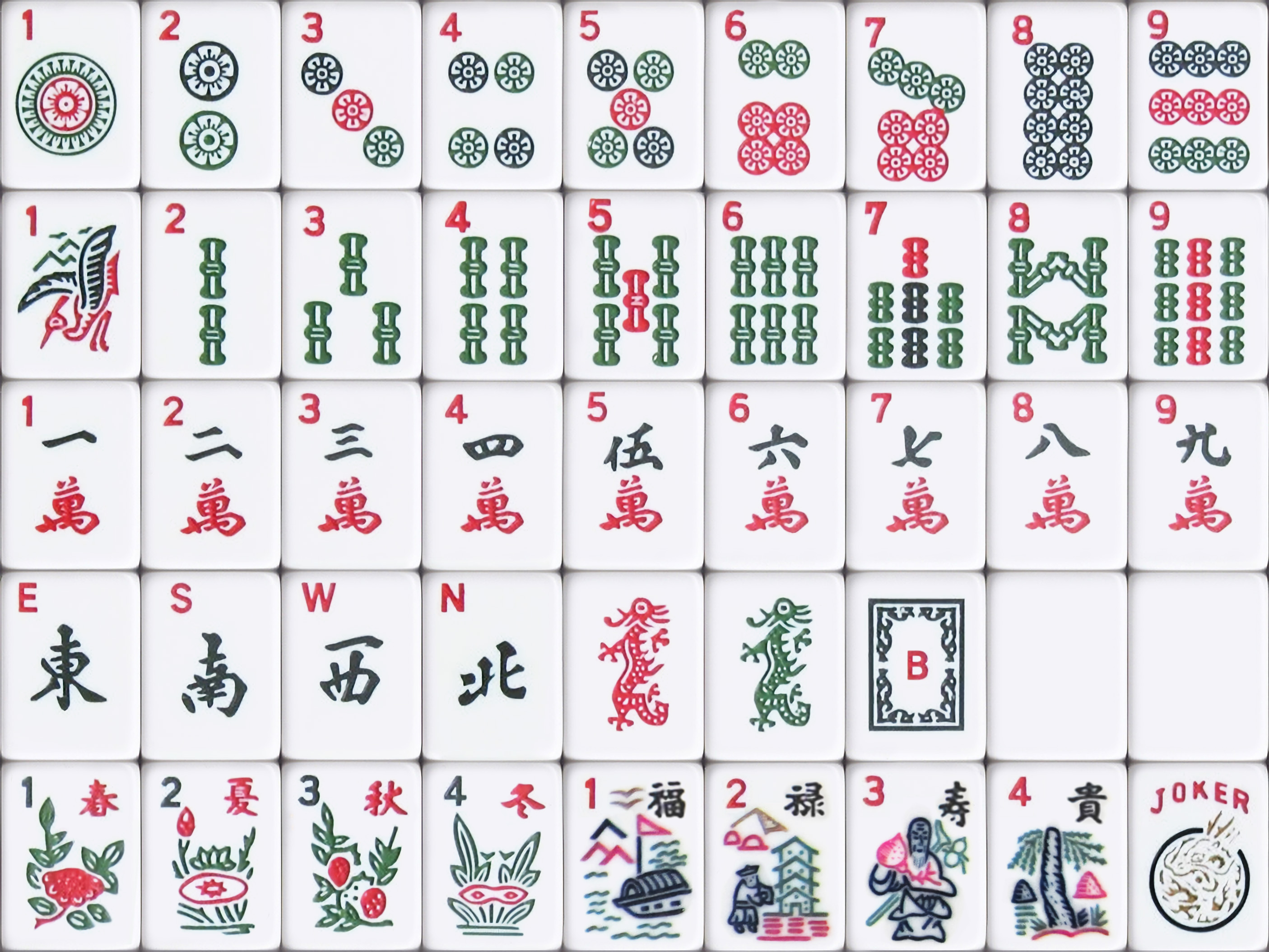
Another America style. Dragon icons are used to replace Chinese characters in the red dragon and green dragon.

== Construction ==
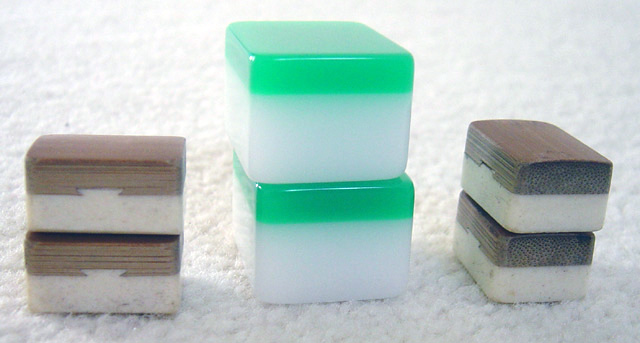
Plastic tiles in the middle; tiles using bone and bamboo on the left and right sides

Traditionally, Mahjong tiles were made of bone, often backed with bamboo. Bone tiles are still available but most modern sets are constructed from various plastics such as bakelite, celluloid, nylon and PET (often, recycled PET). There are a small number of sets that have been made with ivory or jade, but these are exceedingly rare: most sets sold as ivory are in fact made from bone. Regardless of the material used to construct the tiles, the symbols on them are almost always engraved or pressed into the material. Some expert players can determine the face value of their tiles without actually looking at them by feeling these engravings with their fingers.

There are generally two size categories available, the larger mainland-China size and the smaller Taiwanese/Japanese/American size. However, within the former category (Mainland Chinese), 4 sizes have been roughly standardized:

- Size 8: 39 mm × 30 mm × 23 mm (1 9/16 in × 1 3/16 in × 7/8 in)
- Size 7.5: 38 mm × 28 mm × 22 mm (1 1/2 in × 1 1/8 in × 7/8 in)
- Size 7: 36 mm × 26 mm × 21 mm (1 7/16 in × 1 in × 13/16 in)
- Size 6: 34 mm × 25 mm × 19 mm (1 5/16 in × 1 in × 3/4 in)

The length to thickness ratio in all of these must be above 1:1.5, so that the tiles can steadily stand upright, since Chinese players use no racks to support their tiles in hand during play.

The sizes within the second category (Taiwanese/Japanese/American tiles) have lengths that vary roughly between 25 and 30 mm (1–1 3/16 in). However, the Japanese tiles set themselves apart within this class by virtue of their thickness, which allows them to stand upright—despite their diminutive overall size. This enables Japanese mahjong players also to dispense with the use of racks (these are pervasive in the American game, in combination with slimmer tiles).

== Unicode ==
Mahjong tiles were added to the Unicode Standard in April, 2008 with the release of version 5.1.

The Unicode block for mahjong tiles is U+1F000–U+1F02B:

Mahjong Tiles^{[1]}^{[2]} Official Unicode Consortium code chart (PDF)
	0	1	2	3	4	5	6	7	8	9	A	B	C	D	E	F
U+1F00x	🀀	🀁	🀂	🀃	🀄	🀅	🀆	🀇	🀈	🀉	🀊	🀋	🀌	🀍	🀎	🀏
U+1F01x	🀐	🀑	🀒	🀓	🀔	🀕	🀖	🀗	🀘	🀙	🀚	🀛	🀜	🀝	🀞	🀟
U+1F02x	🀠	🀡	🀢	🀣	🀤	🀥	🀦	🀧	🀨	🀩	🀪	🀫				
Notes 1.As of Unicode version 18.0 2.Grey areas indicate non-assigned code points

== See also ==
- Mahjong mat
