= Mahjong mat =

Asian bamboo mat

A Mahjong mat also known as bamboo summer mat is a summer sleeping mat used in Asia. It is made of small pieces of woven split bamboo that help to lower body temperature and improve comfort during sleep.

== Etymology ==
The mahjong mat it is known in Chinese as a liangxi (凉席) literally cool woven mat, usually translated as summer sleeping mat. Mahjong mat is the name given to it by association with the Mahjong tiles used in the traditional Chinese game with the same name.

== History ==
Mahjong mats are made of hundreds of small bamboo tiles shaped like Mahjong tiles from the tile-based game that was developed in the 19th century in China. Thomas Taylor Meadows mentions these summer mats in his travel diaries in 1856.

In Korea, the summer beds were the most modest and basic bed used by the people in the 19th century. It slats were made of pine as well as bamboo.

By the middle and late 1990s, Mahjong mats were at their peak popularity. China had about a 1000 production lines in full operation in many of the bamboo producing areas of China. Bamboo summer mats were one of the seven categories of bamboo products listed by the Communist government of China in order to promote the industry in 1997. However, in the late 1990s and early 2000s, as more modern foam beds developed, and air-conditioners became more common as a cooling method, the popularity of mahjong bamboo mats dropped significantly.

== Production ==
Mahjong bamboo mats are made from a variety of bamboo according to availability in the area of production. In Vietnam, the mats are made from Dendrocalamus barbatus.

== Use ==
Different from foam mats, mahjong bamboo mats are popular both during the rainy season and the hot season in Southeast Asia as they do not absorb water and can be cooled. Being easily rolled up for storage, their cleaning is also easy as it can be dry cleaned with a damp cloth.

In China, mahjong mats are usually bought at cheap prices at the beginning of the summer and are thrown away as garbage at the end of the hot season as they are slept on directly.

In fact, mahjong mats are considered to be the types of sleeping mats which have the highest specific heat capacity. The large specific heat capacity means a specific object can help heat to be absorbed, so if the initial temperature of the mat is lower than the human body surface temperature, sleeping on the bamboo mat will feel cooler.

However, mahjong mats also have poor air permeability, high hardness, and they tend to break easily when the bedding is uneven. Bamboo mats with spray patterns can also cause contact dermatitis.

== See also ==
- Bamboo wife
