= EN 13537 =

European standard for sleeping bag temperature ratings

EN 13537 (or EN13537) is a European standard designed to standardize the temperature ratings on sleeping bags manufactured and/or sold in Europe. As of 1 January 2005 a CEN criterion came into effect covering the testing and publication of temperature ratings for sleeping bags. The new criterion differs from the standards that existed formerly. In 2016 this standard was superseded by ISO EN 23537:2016, and then ISO 23537-1:2022.

== Sleeping bag labeling ==
A European criterion for sleeping bags came into effect on 1 January 2005. This criterion has significant legal connotations for brands, distributors and retailers selling sleeping bags in Europe.

There is a key change to the way sleeping bags are labeled. A European criterion means that all sleeping bags adhering to the criterion will have the temperature ratings set by a standard laboratory test. This means that sleeping bags from different manufacturers will all have comparable temperatures.

There is no legal obligation for brands to conform, as the criterion is optional.

"EN 13537:2002 Requirements for Sleeping Bags" is the official European criterion for the classification of sleeping bags. EN13537 applies to all sleeping bags with the exemption of sleeping bags for military use and sleeping bags for extreme temperatures, i.e., comfort range below -25 °C. The criterion was originally published in 2002 and has now been adopted in most European countries, and also used by numerous outdoor companies outside of Europe. This norm was superseded in 2013 by EN 13537:2012 and in 2016 by ISO EN 23537:2016.

The criterion is used in the following countries: Austria, Belgium, Czech Republic, Denmark, Finland, France, Germany, Greece, Hungary, Iceland, Ireland, Italy, Luxembourg, Malta, the Netherlands, New Zealand, Norway, Poland, Portugal, Romania, Slovakia, Spain, Sweden, Switzerland, and United Kingdom.

== Testing ==
EN13537 requires a thermal manikin test which produces four temperature results — upper limit, comfort, lower limit, and extreme. These temperatures were worked for normal consumers.

The standard measures four temperature ratings:

Upper Limit
the temperature at which a standard male can sleep without excessive perspiration. It is established with the hood and zippers open and with the arms outside of the bag.
Comfort
the temperature at which a standard female can expect to sleep comfortably in a relaxed position.
Lower Limit
the temperature at which a standard male with a rolled-curled up body posture is globally in thermal equilibrium and just not feeling cold.
Extreme
the minimum temperature at which a standard female can remain for six hours without risk of death from hypothermia (though frostbite is still possible).

For the purpose of these measurements, a "standard man" is assumed to be 25 years old, with a height of 1.73 m and a weight of 73 kg; a "standard woman" is assumed to be 25 years old, with a height of 1.60 m and a weight of 60 kg. These ratings are taken assuming that the subject is using a sleeping pad with an R-value of approximately 5.38, tent and is wearing one base layer of thermal underwear, socks and warm hat.
