= Scoring in Mahjong =

Traditional Chinese game of four players

Scoring in Mahjong, a game for four players that originated in China, involves the players obtaining points for their hand of tiles, then paying each other based on the differences in their score and who obtained mahjong (won the hand). The points are given a monetary value agreed by the players. Although in many variations scoreless hands (推倒胡 tui dao hu in Mandarin, 雞糊 gai wu in Cantonese) are possible, many require that hands be of some point value in order to win the round.

While the basic gameplay is more or less the same throughout mahjong, the most significant divergence between variations lies in the scoring systems. Like the gameplay, there is a generalized system of scoring, based on the method of winning and the winning hand, from which Chinese and Japanese (among notable systems) base their roots. American mahjong generally has wildly divergent scoring rules.

Because of the large differences between the various scoring systems (especially for Chinese variants), groups of players will often need to agree on particular scoring rules before a game to eliminate possible disputes during the game. As with the gameplay, many attempts have been made to create an international scoring standard, but most are not widely accepted.

== Criteria ==
Points are obtained for a hand by matching it against various criteria, with different criteria scoring different values. Criteria can include particular melds or other tiles held, how the (winning) hand was completed, possession of various special combinations, etc. Some of these criteria may be subsets of other criteria (for example, having a meld of one dragon versus having a meld of all of them), and in these cases, only the criteria with the tighter requirements is scored. The points obtained may be translated into scores for each player using some (typically exponential) function. When gambling with mahjong, these scores are typically directly translated into sums of money paid between players.

The terminology of point differs from variation to variation. A common English term is double, as the point-to-score translation is typically exponential with a base of 2. (This is not to be confused with the doubling applied to the basic point score in some variations.) Chinese variants will use the term 翻 (pinyin: fan, literal meaning: double). Taiwanese mahjong, however, uses the term 台 (pinyin: tái) along with a linear scoring system.

Points and score relate to two distinct concepts - based on the points obtained in a round, and other factors, players pay each other money. Chips or similar tokens can be used instead, or a score can simply be calculated.

Each player begins the game with the same score. When settling up, in many cases only the winner is paid with the winner's gain being deducted from the three losers' scores (that is, the losers pay the winner). However, payment between players can be arranged in other ways. A common set of modifiers (for which this article will call the standard payment variations) include:

- In the case where a player wins by a discard (a player picks off an opponent), the player who performs the discard pays double
- In the case where a player wins by a draw (a player wins by self-pick), every losing player pays double.
- In the case where a player wins from a high-risk scenario (see below), the player who performs the discard pays for the other two losing players (in addition to the normal double share).

If playing with chips, there is no universal rule for the situation when a player runs out. In some circles, the match is immediately aborted, with the player furthest ahead in score declared the winner, while in others, a player out of chips continues to play without risk of further losses. Alternatively, the loser may pay cash to buy back chips from the winners and the game continues.

The rules mentioned below are by no means exhaustive or common to every variation, but are common to many 13-tile and 16-tile variations.

== Scoring rules ==
=== Hong Kong scoring ===
In the traditional Hong Kong scoring system or the Cantonese scoring system, scoring tends to be low due to the few criteria used.

The general scoring modifiers apply (see above), with the point translation function being a piecewise function: a constant amount is given for scoreless hands, and the score is doubled for each point (that is, an exponential function). Because zero-point hands are common, players often play with the additional restriction that a winning hand must be of some point value, often anywhere between one and five points, with three being the most common.

=== Chinese Classical scoring ===
Scoring in the Chinese Classical system, from which the Babcock system is derived, proceeds as follows. When one player has won the hand by obtaining mahjong

- each player adds up basic points for their hand based on possession of certain melds, pairs and bonus tiles
- winner adds additional basic points for obtaining mahjong, and possibly for completing their hand in various special ways (for example, getting their last tile from the wall)
- each player doubles their basic points one or more times based on possession of certain rarer melds or combinations of melds (for example a set of the prevailing wind tiles)
- winner doubles their basic points one or more times based on their hand forming certain rarer patterns (for example, composed entirely of honour tiles) or being completed in a special way (for example, robbing an exposed kong)

The winner collects their total points from each of the three losers. The losers pay each other the difference in their points. East pays or receives double amounts in their transactions.

Various "Special Limit" hands exist which, if obtained (which is unlikely), give the holder the maximum permitted amount (the limit) of points for their hand.

=== Taiwanese scoring ===
Unlike Hong Kong scoring, Taiwanese scoring employs a linear relationship between tai (台) (points in the Taiwanese system) and chips. When a win occurs in Taiwanese Mahjong, the number of tai of the winning hand is multiplied by a factor and then added to a base score. For example, if the base and factor are 3 and 2, respectively, then the loser to a 5-tai hand pays the winner 13 (3+2×5).

The Taiwanese system follows a different payment procedure from the standard procedure mentioned earlier:

- In the case where a player wins by a discard (a player picks off an opponent), the player who performs the discard pays each winner (there may be more than one).
- In the case where a player wins by a draw (a player wins by self-pick), each player except the winner pays the winner.

When the dealer is involved in either the winning or losing side of a hand, extra tai (one plus twice the number of times the dealer has consecutively retained the dealership) are added to the dealer's winnings or losses.

=== Shanghai scoring ===
In contrast, the scoring system used in the Shanghai variant is high due to the diverse number of scoring criteria and inflated values for rarer hands such as the thirteen terminals. Because of the inflated point values, there is generally a minimum point value in the Shanghai variant.

=== Singaporean scoring ===
Singaporean scoring is similar to that of the Chinese Classical system but accounts for the different set of tiles used therein. Again, standard payment variations apply, although variants exist where the dealer must also pay and receive double.

=== Japanese scoring ===
The Japanese scoring system is the system that is found in many Mahjong video games. There are two sources of doubling points (Yaku and Dora), of which at least one Yaku is mandatory to go out. There are various point caps that reduce the chip value of high point hands, and a set of special hands that jump straight to the highest available point value (Yakuman). In real tile settings, the chip values are typically represented by a series of bars resembling elongated Chinese dominoes, in four denominations: 10,000, 5,000, 1,000, and 100.

=== American scoring ===
A side effect of the Babcock scoring system in the 1920s was that many players frequently sought after limit hands rather than hands of smaller value. Because of this, the common hands were eventually abandoned, and the only way one could win was to match a hand from a list of hands.

Today, in the American variations, players use a card that defines a small set of hands that are the only valid winning hands, with a point value given for each hand. This system is used by the two major governing bodies of Mahjong in the United States, the National Mah Jongg League and the American Mah-Jongg Association, with new cards that define the valid winning hands released annually.

Typically, each card contains scoring criteria that make references to the year the scoring cards are released. For example, the 1985 scoring hand will have hands containing "melds" of a one, nine, eight, and five of a certain suit.

== Scoring limits ==
Some variations may impose a scoring limit - a maximum to the number of points for a given hand. In many cases where limits exist, there may be either multiple limits, or ways to obtain multiples of a limit. In many cases where limits exist, the typical point translation function is exponential, where a constant score is assigned to points up to the first limit, and afterwards increases (often doubles) as further limits are reached. The Taiwanese system does not employ scoring limits.

A scoring limit may be more of a gambling incentive: for example, if six and nine points were scoring limits, a seven- or eight-point hand would be worth the same as a six-point hand, which may be an incentive for players to go for nine-point hands.

== High-risk discards ==
Many variations may also impose penalties for discards that are considered to be "high-risk" when the size of the wall is winding down. If a player wins from a high-risk discard, or goes out self-drawn after claiming a high-risk discard, the player(s) who made the high-risk discard(s) have to pay for the winner's points, and the other players are off the hook. A discard is considered risky if there were enough open melds to reveal the fact that said discard is very likely to enable completing a limit hand before it was claimed. Note that some rulesets always make the discarder pay anyway. In this case, going out self-drawn after claiming a risky discard will trigger the penalty. The intent of these rules is to punish the player who foolishly enabled the completion of the limit hand.
