= Mahjong =

Chinese tile-based game

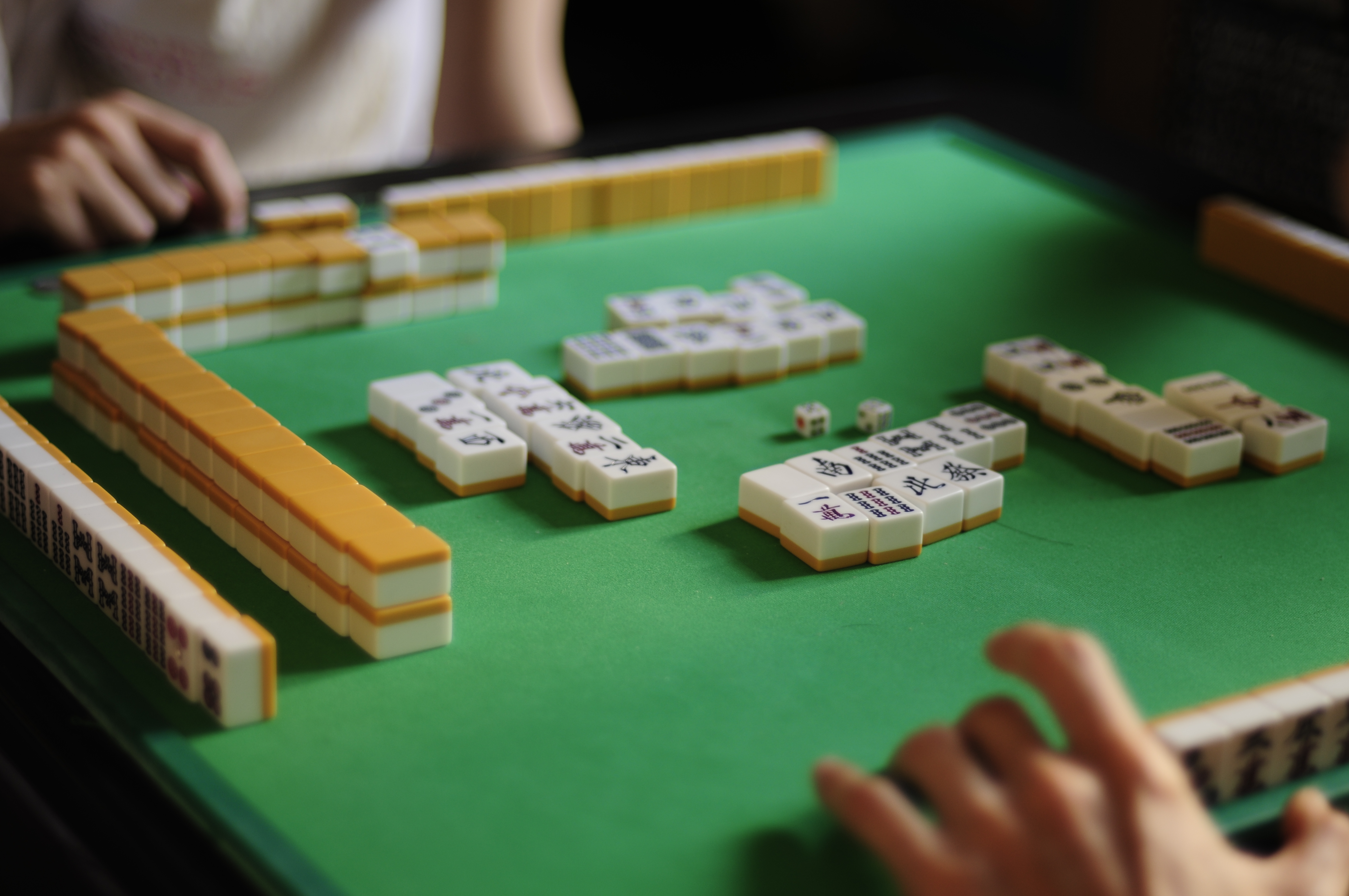
- Years active: Late 19th century to present
- Genres: Tile-based game; Abstract strategy game; Mind sport
- Players: 2–4 players
- Setup time: 1–5 minutes
- Playing time: Dependent on variation or rules
- Chance: Moderate
- Skills: Tactics, observation, risk management, adaptive strategies

Mahjong
- "Mahjong" in Traditional (top) and Simplified (bottom) Chinese characters

Chinese name
- Traditional Chinese: 麻將
- Simplified Chinese: 麻将
Transcriptions
Standard Mandarin
- Hanyu Pinyin: májiàng
- Wade–Giles: ma^{2}-chiang^{4}
- IPA: [mǎ.tɕjâŋ]
Wu
- Romanization: mo ziang
Gan
- Romanization: ma4-chiong4
Hakka
- Romanization: ma jiong3
Yue: Cantonese
- Yale Romanization: màahjeung
- Jyutping: maa4-zoeng3
- IPA: [ma˩.tsœŋ˧]
Southern Min
- Hokkien POJ: mâ-chiong

Original/Southern Name
- Traditional Chinese: 麻雀
- Simplified Chinese: 麻雀
- Literal meaning: little sparrows
Transcriptions
Standard Mandarin
- Hanyu Pinyin: má què
Hakka
- Romanization: ma4-jiok3
Yue: Cantonese
- Yale Romanization: màh-jeuk
- Jyutping: maa4-zoek3
- IPA: [ma˩.tsœk̚˧]
Southern Min
- Hokkien POJ: Moâ-chhiok
Eastern Min
- Fuzhou BUC: Mà-chiók
Pu-Xian Min
- Hinghwa BUC: Má-chio̤h

Vietnamese name
- Vietnamese: mạt chược

Thai name
- Thai: ไพ่นกกระจอก
- RTGS: phai nok krachok

Korean name
- Hangul: 마작
- Hanja: 麻雀
Transcriptions
- Revised Romanization: majak
- McCune–Reischauer: majak

Japanese name
- Kanji: 麻雀
- Kana: マージャン
Transcriptions
- Romanization: mājan

Filipino name
- Tagalog: madyong, mationg, machiong

Khmer name
- Khmer: ម៉ាចុង

Mahjong (Note: Mah-jong has many spelling variants. It can be spelled with a space replacing the hyphen, with neither, as mah-jongg, or (according to modern Mandarin transliteration) as májiàng. The most commonly provided pronunciation in English dictionaries is /ˌmɑː.ˈdʒɒŋ/, mah-JONG.) is a tile-based game for two to four players. Though regional variations may exclude certain tiles or add unique ones, it is typically played with a set of 144 tiles based on Chinese characters and symbols. Players hold one of four "wind" positions referred to as the East, South, West, and North. Once each player draws a hand of thirteen tiles, in anti-clockwise order beginning with the "prevailing wind," each player draws a tile, then discards that tile or another from their hand. Players may call to use another player's discarded tile under certain conditions. The objective of each round is to complete and score a legal hand using a drawn tile or another player's discarded tile to form four melds (or sets) and a pair (eye.) Players may also score with special hands that do not follow the typical pattern. Players hold a persistent score across rounds until the game ends.

Mahjong was developed in the 19th century in China and has spread throughout the world since the early 20th century. The game and its regional variants are played throughout the Sinosphere in East and Southeast Asia and have also become popular in Western countries. The game has been adapted into a widespread form of online entertainment. Similar to the Western card game rummy, mahjong is a game of skill, strategy, and luck. To distinguish it from mahjong solitaire, it is sometimes referred to as mahjong rummy.

While mahjong typically follows a common set of rules for the order of play, how tiles are dealt, how a piece is drawn and discarded, what melds are allowed, and how suits (numbered tiles) and honors (winds and dragons) are used, regional variations and house rules may differ moderately to radically on criteria for legal melds, winning hands, and scoring systems, and may feature additional rules.

== Etymology ==
The game was originally called 麻雀 (pinyin: máquè; Jyutping: maa4zoek3–2)—meaning 'sparrow'—which is still used in several Chinese languages, mostly in the south, such as Cantonese and Hokkien. It is said that the clacking of tiles during shuffling resembles the chittering of sparrows. It has also been suggested that the name came from an evolution of an earlier card game called Madiao from which mahjong tiles were adapted. In Chinese, 麻雀戰 (麻雀战; máquè zhàn) denotes a form of guerrilla warfare tactics colloquially called 'sparrow warfare (tactics)'. Other languages, such as Sichuanese, Shanghainese and Standard Mandarin, now call the game 麻將 (májiàng), which is a nasal erhua form of the original name. Its name is similar in other languages, except in Thai, where it is called ไพ่นกกระจอก (phai nok krachok), a calque meaning 'sparrow cards'.

== History ==
There are two disputed origins of mahjong, namely Ningbo and Fujian. The author of the first mahjong guidebook, Yifan Shen, wrote in his book "Illustrated Mahjong Guide" (1914) that the birth of mahjong was roughly thirty years earlier in Ningbo, which is around the late 19th century. In the book "Endless History (博史)" written by Chinese scholar Yaquan Du in 1933, he believed that "mahjong was originally popular among fishermen in Guangdong and Fujian. Later in the early years of Guangxu, it spread among the businessmen in Ningbo.

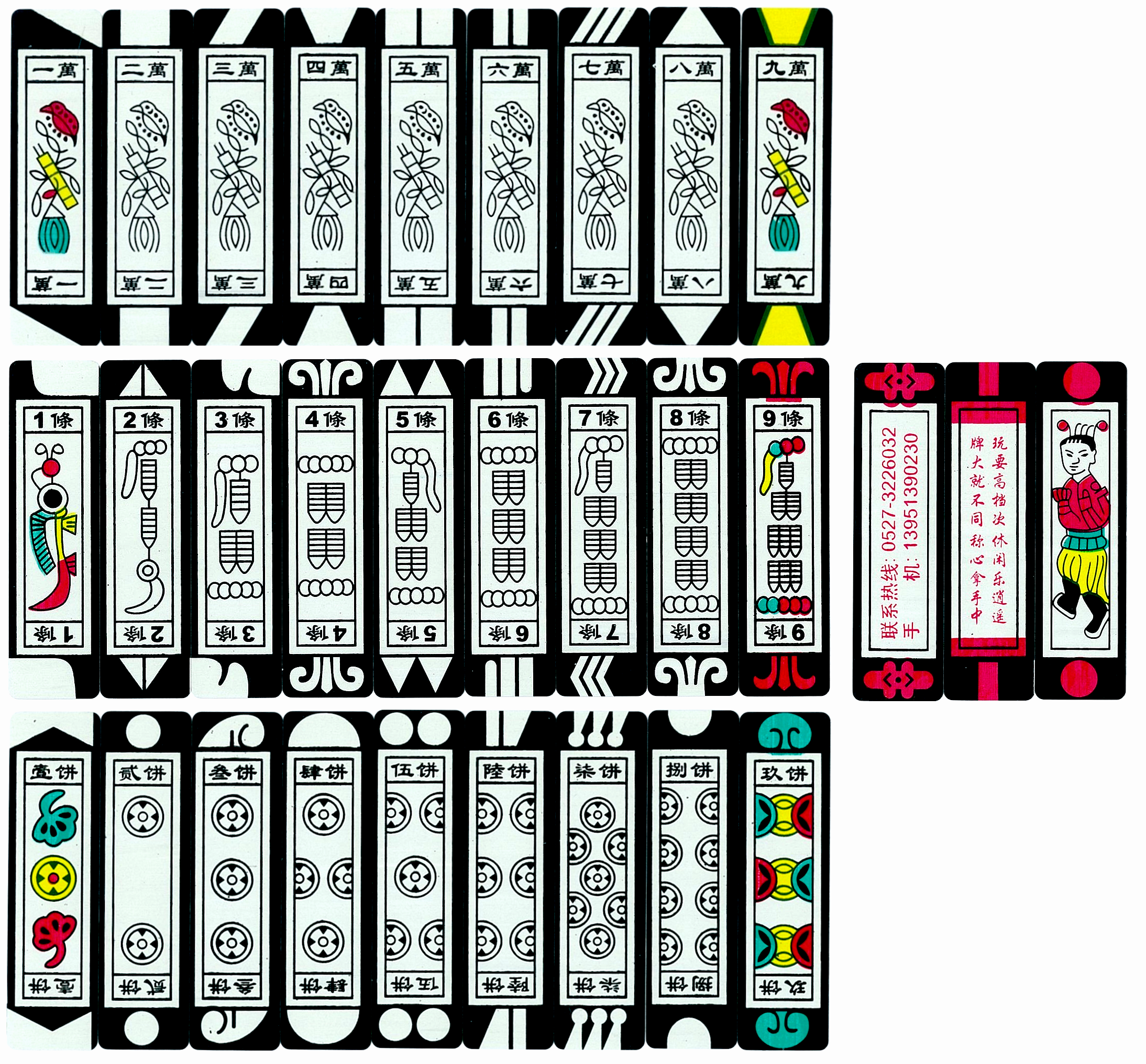
Money-suited cards

Roughly speaking, mahjong started in late Qing, around the 19th century, with different scholars debating its actual year of invention. Late Qing scholar, lecturer of the Shanghai Jiaotong University, Zhixian Xu wrote in the book "Folklore of the Ten Leaves" that the popularity of mahjong grew in the last years of Guangxu (after the end of the First Sino-Japanese War in 1895). One can conclude that the decades between the late 19th century to the early 20th century were the infant years of mahjong.

Mahjong is based on draw-and-discard card games that were popular in 18th and 19th century China, some of which are still popular today. They were played with a stripped deck of money-suited cards. Each deck is divided into three suits of Cash or coins, Strings of cash, and Myriads of strings. There are nine ranks in each suit. In addition, there are three wild cards: Red flower, White flower, and Old thousand. Depending on the game, there are multiple copies of each card.

Games scholar David Parlett has written that the Western card games Conquian and Rummy share a common origin with Mahjong. All these games involve players drawing and discarding tiles or cards to make melds. Khanhoo is an early example of such a game. The most likely ancestor to Mahjong was pènghú which was played with 120 or 150 cards. During the late 19th century, pènghú was used interchangeably with máquè in both card and tile form.

It is not known when the conversion from cards to tiles took place precisely but it most likely occurred in the middle of the 19th century. The earliest surviving tile sets date to around 1870 and were acquired in Fuzhou, Shanghai, and Ningbo. These sets differ from modern ones in several ways, there were no "flower" and fā ("green dragon") tiles. In their place were "king" tiles for heaven, earth, man, and harmony and also for each of the 4 "winds" which may have acted as bonus tiles. In the contemporaneous Himly set, there were no zhōng ("red dragon") tiles either. Instead there were the wild cards known as Cash Flower, String Flower, and Myriad Flower plus an additional tile, the king of everything. These early jokers are still found in Vietnamese sets. They may have been removed as the tiles share the same titles as the leaders of the Taiping Rebellion (1850–1864). For example, Hong Xiuquan was the self-styled "Heavenly King of Great Peace" and his top subordinates were called east king, south king, west king, and north king.

The ban on gambling after the founding of the People's Republic in 1949 led to a decline in playing. The game itself was banned during the Cultural Revolution (1966–1976). Today, it is a favorite pastime in China and other Chinese-speaking communities.

=== Mahjong in the West ===
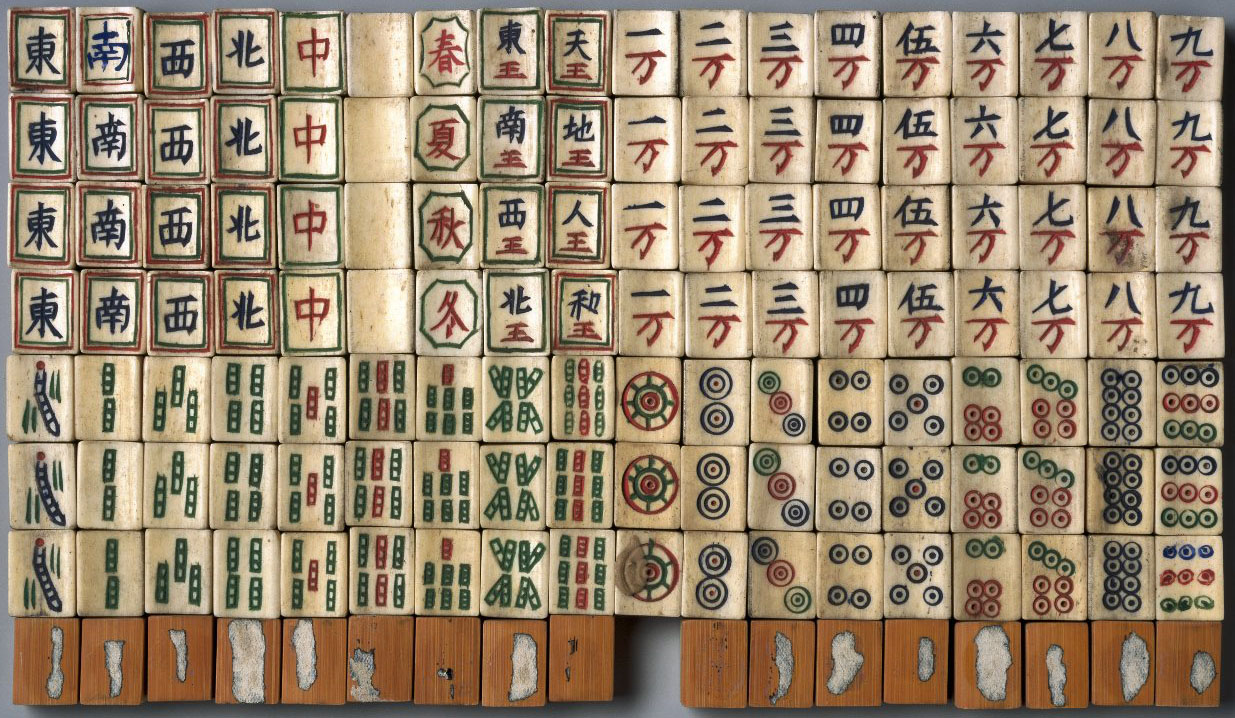
Mahjong tiles of late 19th century, a gift of Glover to the Long Island Historical Society in 1875

The first Western records about mahjong seem to correspond to the papers of British Consul General F.E.B. Harvey, around the time when he served as consul in Ningbo, during the 1860s. He mentions in his papers making the acquaintance of an English-fluent, rank-three official under the Daoguang Emperor, Chen Yumen, who taught him the game. In the same writings he details the rules he was taught by Chen. In 1895, British sinologist William Henry Wilkinson wrote a paper which mentioned a set of cards known in central China by the name of ma chioh, literally, hemp sparrow, which he maintained was the origin of the term Mahjong. He did not explain the dialect of the originator or region specific etymology of this information. By 1910, there were written accounts in many languages, including French and Japanese.

The game was imported to the United States in the 1920s. The first Mahjong sets sold in the U.S. were sold by Abercrombie & Fitch starting in 1920. It became a success in Washington, D.C., and the co-owner of the company, Ezra Fitch, sent emissaries to Chinese villages to buy every Mahjong set they could find. Abercrombie & Fitch sold a total of 12,000 Mahjong sets. Mahjong became a central part of cultural bonding for Chinese Americans in the 1920s and '30s in Chinatown, Manhattan and was part of community building for suburban American Jewish women in the 1940s and 50s.

Also in 1920, Joseph Park Babcock published his book Rules of Mah-Jongg, also known as the "red book". This was the earliest version of Mahjong known in America. Babcock had learned Mahjong while living in China. His rules simplified the game to make it easier for Americans to take up, and his version was common through the Mahjong fad of the 1920s. Later, when the 1920s fad died out, many of Babcock's simplifications were abandoned.

The game has taken on a number of trademarked names, such as "Pung Chow" and the "Game of Thousand Intelligences". Mahjong nights in America often involved dressing and decorating rooms in Chinese style. Several hit songs were recorded during the Mahjong fad, most notably "Since Ma Is Playing Mah Jong" by Eddie Cantor.

Many variants of Mahjong developed during this period. By the 1930s, many revisions of the rules developed that were substantially different from Babcock's classical version (including some that were considered fundamentals in other variants, such as the notion of a standard hand). Standardization came with the formation of the National Mah Jongg League (NMJL) in 1937, along with the first American Mahjong rulebook, Maajh: The American Version of the Ancient Chinese Game, written by NMJL's first president and co-founder, Viola L. Cecil. In 1999, a second organization was formed, the American Mah Jongg Association.

In the United Kingdom, British author Alan D. Millington revived the Chinese classical game of the 1920s with his book The Complete Book of Mah-jongg (1977). This handbook includes a formal rules set for the game.

=== Current development ===
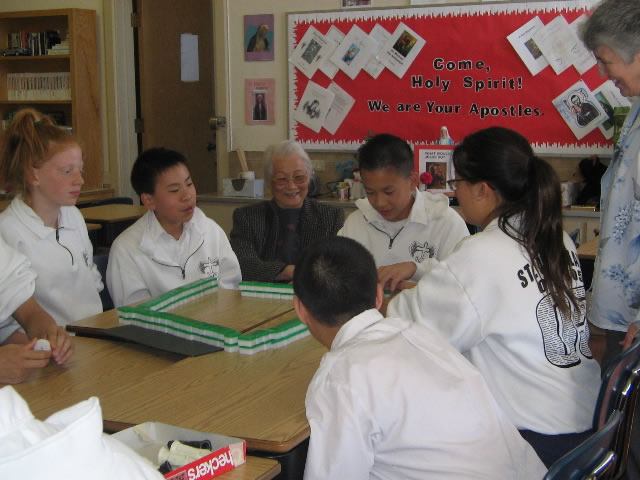
Students in the United States learning how to play Mahjong

There are many governing bodies which often host exhibition games and tournaments for modern and traditional Mahjong gaming.

Mahjong, as of 2010, is the most popular table game in Japan. As of 2008, there were approximately 7.6 million Mahjong players in Japan and an estimated 8,900 Mahjong parlors did ¥300 billion (converting to US$2.8 billion according to exchange rates for 30 April 2020) in sales. There are several manga and anime (e.g. Saki and Akagi) devoted to dramatic and comic situations involving Mahjong. Since the 1980s, hundreds of different Mahjong arcade machines in Japanese video arcades have been created, including strip versions. Newer units can connect with other arcade machines across the Internet.

Mahjong culture is still deeply ingrained in the Chinese community. Sam Hui wrote Cantopop songs using Mahjong as their themes, and Hong Kong movies have often included scenes of Mahjong games. Many gambling movies have been filmed in Hong Kong, and a recent subgenre is the Mahjong movie. Although the popularity of the game in China is still broad, since 1949, mahjong was frowned upon by the government because it is seen as a means of gambling addiction, an issue that the government always sought to tackle.

Prolonged playing of Mahjong may trigger epileptic seizures according to a 2007 study. To date there are 23 reported cases of Mahjong-induced seizures in the English medical literature. Some doctors speculate that this may be due to stress and complex manual movement correlated with intense brain function similar to playing chess or card games such as poker.

Studies by doctors have also shown in Hong Kong that the game is beneficial for individuals suffering from dementia or cognitive memory difficulties, leading to the development of Mahjong therapy. Many elderly in Hong Kong actively and regularly go to Mahjong Schools as a form of leisure and entertainment activities. As the Government has not allowed gambling since the end of World War II, the Government issued 144 licenses to these "schools" in 1956 in order to legalize the operation of places that provide Mahjong entertainment.

Researchers have also used artificial intelligence techniques to develop Mahjong-playing agents using neural networks and reinforcement learning. They have shown that a self-learning machine can be trained to compete with some of the best Riichi Mahjong players.

== Competition ==
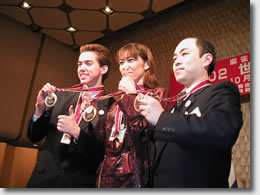
The top 3 in the World Mahjong Championship in Tokyo, October 2002. Left: John J. O'Connor (2nd place). In the middle: world champion Mai Hatsune, from Japan. Right: Yuichi Ikeya (3rd place).

In 1998, in the interest of dissociating illegal gambling from Mahjong, the China State Sports Commission published a new set of rules, now generally referred to as Chinese Official rules or International Tournament rules (国标麻将; Guóbiāo Májiàng). The principles of the new, wholesome Mahjong are no gambling, no drinking, and no smoking. In international tournaments, players are often grouped in teams to emphasize that Mahjong from now on is considered a sport.

The new rules are highly pattern-based. The rulebook contains 81 combinations, based on patterns and scoring elements popular in classic and modern regional Chinese variants; some table practices of Japan have also been adopted. Points for flower tiles (each flower is worth one point) may not be added until the player has scored eight points. The winner of a game receives the score from the player who discards the winning tile, plus eight basic points from each player; in the case of zimo (self-drawn win), they receive the value of this round plus eight points from all players.

The new rules were first used in an international tournament in Tokyo, where, in 2002, the first global tournament in mahjong was organized by the Mahjong Museum, the Japan Mahjong Organizing Committee, and the city council of Ningbo, China. One hundred players participated, mainly from Japan and China, but also from Europe and the United States. Mai Hatsune, from Japan, became the first world champion. The following year saw the first annual China Mahjong Championship, held in Hainan; the next two annual tournaments were held in Hong Kong and Beijing. Most players were Chinese; players from other nations attended as well.

In 2005, the first Open European Mahjong Championship was held in the Netherlands, with 108 players. The competition was won by Masato Chiba from Japan. The second European championship in Copenhagen (2007) was attended by 136 players and won by Danish player Martin Wedel Jacobsen. The first Online European Mahjong Championship was held on the Mahjong Time server in 2007, with 64 players, and the winner was Juliani Leo, from the U.S., and the Best European Player was Gerda van Oorschot, from the Netherlands. The Third Open European Mahjong Championship 2009 at Baden/Vienna, Austria, was won by Japanese player Koji Idota, while runner-up Bo Lang from Switzerland became European Champion. There were 152 participants. The fourth European Mahjong Championship was held in Mestre, Italy, on October 8th, 2011. There were 160 participants and it was won by Ildikó Hargitai from Hungary. Tournaments Calendar - EMA Rankings/ In 2006, the World Mahjong Organization (WMO) was founded in Beijing, China, with the cooperation of, amongst others, the Japan Mahjong Organizing Committee (JMOC) and the European Mahjong Association (EMA). This organization held its first World Mahjong Championship in November 2007 in the Chinese town of Chengdu, attended by 144 participants from all over the world. It was won by Li Li, a Chinese student at Tsinghua University. The next World Championship took place in Utrecht, the Netherlands, 27 to 29 August 2010.

Other major international tournaments include the Mahjong International League's World Mahjong Sports Games and the privately sponsored World Series Of Mahjong.

American mahjong tournaments are held in virtually every state—the largest is in Las Vegas, Nevada, twice a year, and in Atlantic City, New Jersey, by Mah Jongg Madness (MJM), and an annual cruise is hosted by the National Mah Jongg League and MJM. MJM tournaments host between 150 and 500 participants at these larger events; there are several smaller-scale, but equally successful, tournaments held annually by other hosts. Prize pools are based on the number participating. Rules are based on the National Mah Jongg League standard rules.

== Superstitions ==
Even though both skill and chance play a fundamental role in the game, there is no shortage of superstitions in which players believe where they sit, how they hold their pieces or objects they have on their person will somehow affect the outcome. For example, players will try to find seats with the best feng shui or wear their lucky clothing or trinkets. Usually, after one round (everybody has been the dealer once in a particular prevailing wind), players will switch seats. Yet, some players may refuse to do so when they have won multiple games sitting in that seat. They may believe that position possesses luck that is beneficial to them. Some believe that specific pieces (one dot, for example) bode bad luck if received in their opening hand. The belief of feng shui is still rather prevalent in the Chinese society, with over 47% of Chinese adults believing in it.

More elaborate superstitions in mahjong range from those found in the game poker, such as not counting one's wins and losses, to the comical, such as changing one's undergarments after a loss. These rituals have become an integral part of the game experience and its aesthetics.

== In popular culture ==
The game was popular in Shanghai in the mid- to late 1800s where it was part of the nightlife and courtesan halls. By the turn of the century, it was popular enough to be played in the royal palace of Beijing. The game continued to spread to Japan, throughout Southeast Asia, and eventually the United States in the 1920s where it made a mark with the president's family and movie stars in high-society. The game fell out of fashion in the United States during World War I, but was picked up again by the Jewish community in the 1930s. In the early 20th century, the game was banned in China due to its outlook on gambling, but the ban was lifted during Chinese New Years which ironically added to its popularity. The game was completely banned in China during the Cultural Revolution from 1966 to 1976 due to its association with capitalism. The 2018 film Crazy Rich Asians lead to a surge of interest for the game for tourists in Singapore. The game was trending in TikTok for GenZ and Millenials during the Covid-19 pandemic as a way to create social connections and improve mental health. Today, there are several dedicated clubs for Mahjong throughout the United States, and hotels would even host events.

In recent years, the appearance of mahjong in popular culture has contributed to a resurgence in popularity of the game:

- The manga and anime Saki revolves around a high school Mahjong club. Other notable anime and manga with mahjong include Pon no Michi.
- The video game series Like a Dragon allows a player to play Mah-jong games in the form of mini-games.
- In the 2018 film Crazy Rich Asians, the main character Rachel lets the traditional mother of her boyfriend win a Mahjong game at a parlor as a major plot point to convey the nature of their relationship.
- In Kung Fu Panda 4, director Stephanie Ma Stine of Chinese descent made it a point to ensure the authenticity of her culture depicted in the film. To do so, she taught a few members of her animation team how to play Mahjong, which unexpectedly became popular with the rest of the creative crew.

== Old Hong Kong mahjong rules ==
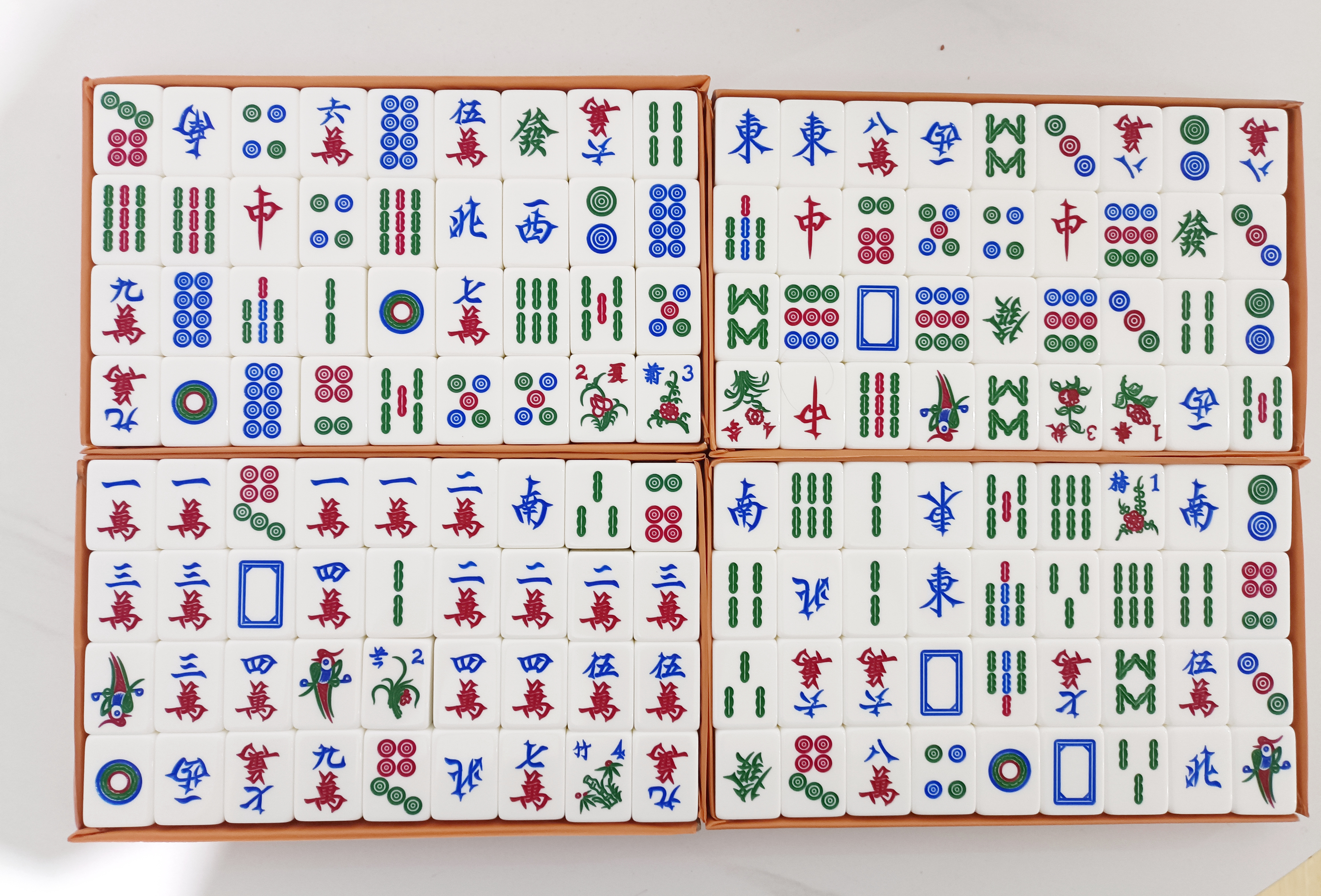
A full set of Mahjong tiles

There are many highly varied versions of mahjong, both in rules and tiles used. "Old Hong Kong mahjong" uses the same basic features and rules as the majority of the different variations of the game. This form of mahjong uses all of the tiles of the most commonly available sets, includes no exotic or complex rules, and has a relatively small set of scoring sets/hands with a simple scoring system. For these reasons, Hong Kong mahjong is a suitable variation for the introduction of game rules and play, and is the focus of this article.

=== Tiles ===
Old Hong Kong mahjong is played with a standard set of 144 mahjong tiles (though cards may be used). Sets often include counters (to keep score), dice (to decide how to deal), and a marker to show who the dealer is and which round is being played. Some sets include racks to hold the tiles, especially if they are larger or smaller than standard tiles or have an odd shape. Mahjong sets originating from the United States, Japan, or Southeast Asia will likely have extra tiles or specialized markings.

The tiles are split into three categories: suited, honors, and bonus tiles.

Mahjong tile count per set
Set		Count
Suited	Dots	36
Suited	Bamboo	36
Suited	Characters	36
Honors	Winds	16
Honors	Dragons	12
Bonus	Flowers	4
Bonus	Seasons	4
Total		144

==== Suited tiles ====
Suited tiles are divided into three suits and each are numbered from 1 to 9. The suits are bamboos, dots, and characters. There are four identical copies of each suited tile, totaling 108 tiles.

		Numbers								
		1	2	3	4	5	6	7	8	9
Suits	Dots 筒									
Suits	Bamboo 索									
Suits	Characters 萬									

The bamboo suit is also known as "sticks", "strings", or "bams" suit; the first tile usually has a bird (traditionally, a peacock or sparrow) instead of a single bamboo. The dots suit is also known as the "wheels", "circles", "coins", "stones", "marbles" or "balls" suit. The characters suit is also known as the "myriads", "cracks" or "numbers" suit since the top characters are numbers in the Chinese writing system, and the bottom characters (in traditional Chinese characters) are the Chinese character for "ten thousand".

==== Honors tiles ====
There are two different sets of honors tiles: winds and dragons. The winds are east, south, west, and north, beginning with east. The dragons are red, green, and white. The white dragon has a blue or black frame on the face of the piece, or in some sets, is entirely blank. These tiles have no numerical sequence like the suited tiles (for example, the bamboo pieces numbered 1 to 9). Like the suited tiles, there are four identical copies of each honors tile, for a total of 28 honors tiles.

Winds
East 東	South 南	West 西	North 北

Dragons
Red 中	Green 發	White 白

==== Bonus tiles ====
There are two sets of bonus tiles: flowers and seasons. The flower and season tiles play a unique role in the mechanics of the game. When drawn, the bonus tile is not added into a player's hand but are instead set aside and kept near the player's other tiles for scoring purposes should they win the hand, and an extra tile is drawn in replacement of the bonus tile.

In addition, unlike the suited and honors tiles, there is only one of each bonus tile, so there are a total of four flower and four season tiles in the set. The tiles have a different artistic rendering of a specific type of flower or season.

Flowers
No	Image	Name	Character	Direction
1		Plum blossom	梅	East
2		Orchid	蘭	South
3		Chrysanthemum	菊	West
4		Bamboo	竹	North

Seasons
No	Image	Name	Character	Direction
1		Spring	春	East
2		Summer	夏	South
3		Autumn	秋	West
4		Winter	冬	North

It is not necessary to know the names or the Chinese characters of each bonus tile, only the number, as this is associated with a specific direction, and the player receives bonus points when the bonus tile matches the seat direction. There is no relation between the bonus tile "bamboo" flower and the bamboo suit of suited tiles (e.g., 4 bamboo). In traditional Chinese culture, the Four Gentlemen are the plum (winter), orchid (spring), bamboo (summer), and chrysanthemum (autumn), which are regarded as the representative plants of those seasons, but people regard it as plum blossom (spring), orchid (summer), chrysanthemum (autumn), and bamboo (winter) now.

=== Choosing table positions and first dealer ===
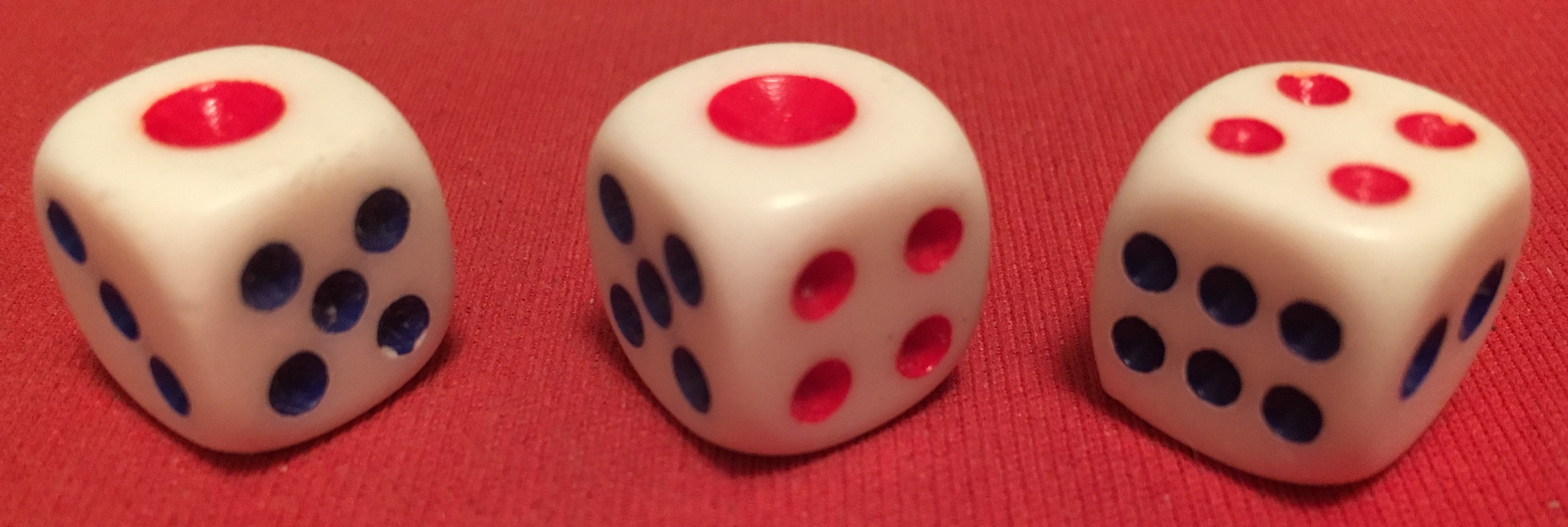
Chinese dice

Before the game can begin, players need to be assigned one of the wind positions at the table – those being (in counterclockwise order) East, South, West, and North. East will also be the first dealer. Play proceeds in this counterclockwise order.

There are a variety of ways to determine positions. For example, one way is to have each player roll the dice and assign East to the player who rolls the highest, South to the second-highest, and so on. Another way is to shuffle the 4 wind tiles face down and have each player choose one, determining their position.

=== Hands, rounds, and matches ===
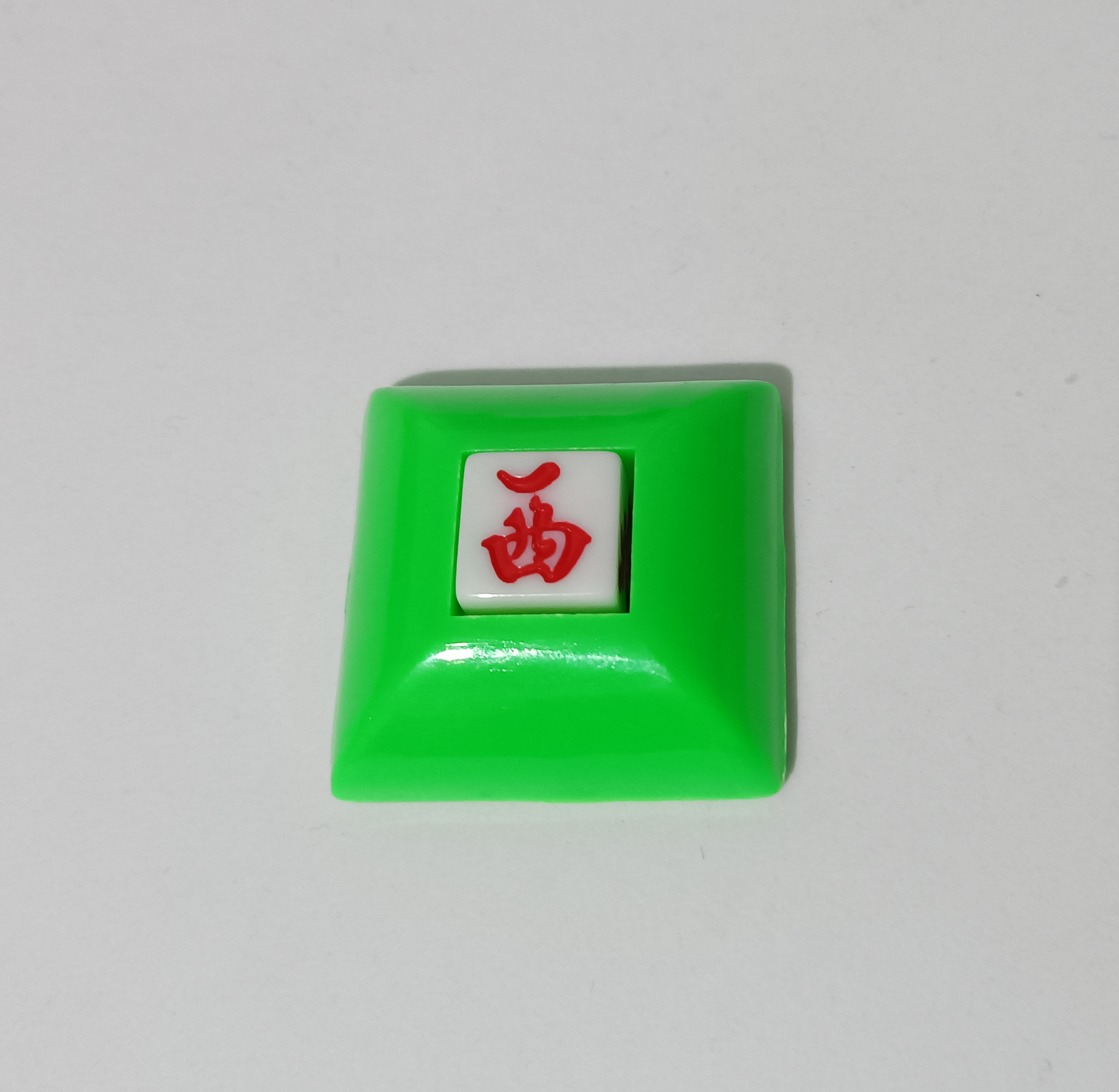
Cubic dealer and prevailing wind marker

A match consists of four rounds, each representing a "prevailing wind", starting with East. Once the first round is completed, a second round begins with South as the prevailing wind, and so on. Wind position is significant in that it affects the scoring of the game. A mahjong set with winds in play will usually include a separate prevailing wind marker (typically a die marked with the wind characters in a holder).

In each round at least four hands are played, with each player taking the position of dealer. In the first hand of each round, Player 1 (winner of the dice toss) is East and therefore dealer. In the second hand, Player 2 takes the East position, shifting the seat winds amongst the players counter-clockwise (though players do not physically move their chairs). This continues until all four players have been East (dealer). A marker is used to mark which player is East and often the round number. (In sets with racks, a rack may be marked differently to denote the dealer.)

Whenever a player in the East position (dealer) wins a hand, or if there is no winner (a draw or "goulash hand"), an extra hand is played with the same seating positions and prevailing wind as in the previous hand. This means that a match may potentially have no limit to the number of hands played (though some players will set a limit of three consecutive hands allowed with the same seat positions and prevailing wind).

Example of games:

Example of a standard 16-hand game with two extra hands played (per no-winner hand (goulash) and per east winning hand)
Round	Hand number	Prevailing wind	Player 1	Player 2	Player 3	Player 4	Comment
1	1	East	East (dealer)	South	West	North	
1	2	East	North	East (dealer)	South	West	
1	3	East	West	North	East (dealer)	South	
1	4	East	South	West	North	East (dealer)	
2	5	South	East (dealer)	South	West	North	
2	6	South	North	East (dealer)	South	West	
2	7	South	West	North	East (dealer)	South	No one wins (goulash)
2	Extra hand	South	West	North	East (dealer)	South	Repeat of seat positions
2	8	South	South	West	North	East (dealer)	
3	9	West	East (dealer)	South	West	North	
3	10	West	North	East (dealer)	South	West	
3	11	West	West	North	East (dealer)	South	
3	12	West	South	West	North	East (dealer)	
4	13	North	East (dealer)	South	West	North	
4	14	North	North	East (dealer)	South	West	East wins hand
4	Extra hand	North	North	East (dealer)	South	West	Repeat of seat positions
4	15	North	West	North	East (dealer)	South	
4	16	North	South	West	North	East (dealer)	

=== Dealing tiles ===
==== Shuffling tiles ====
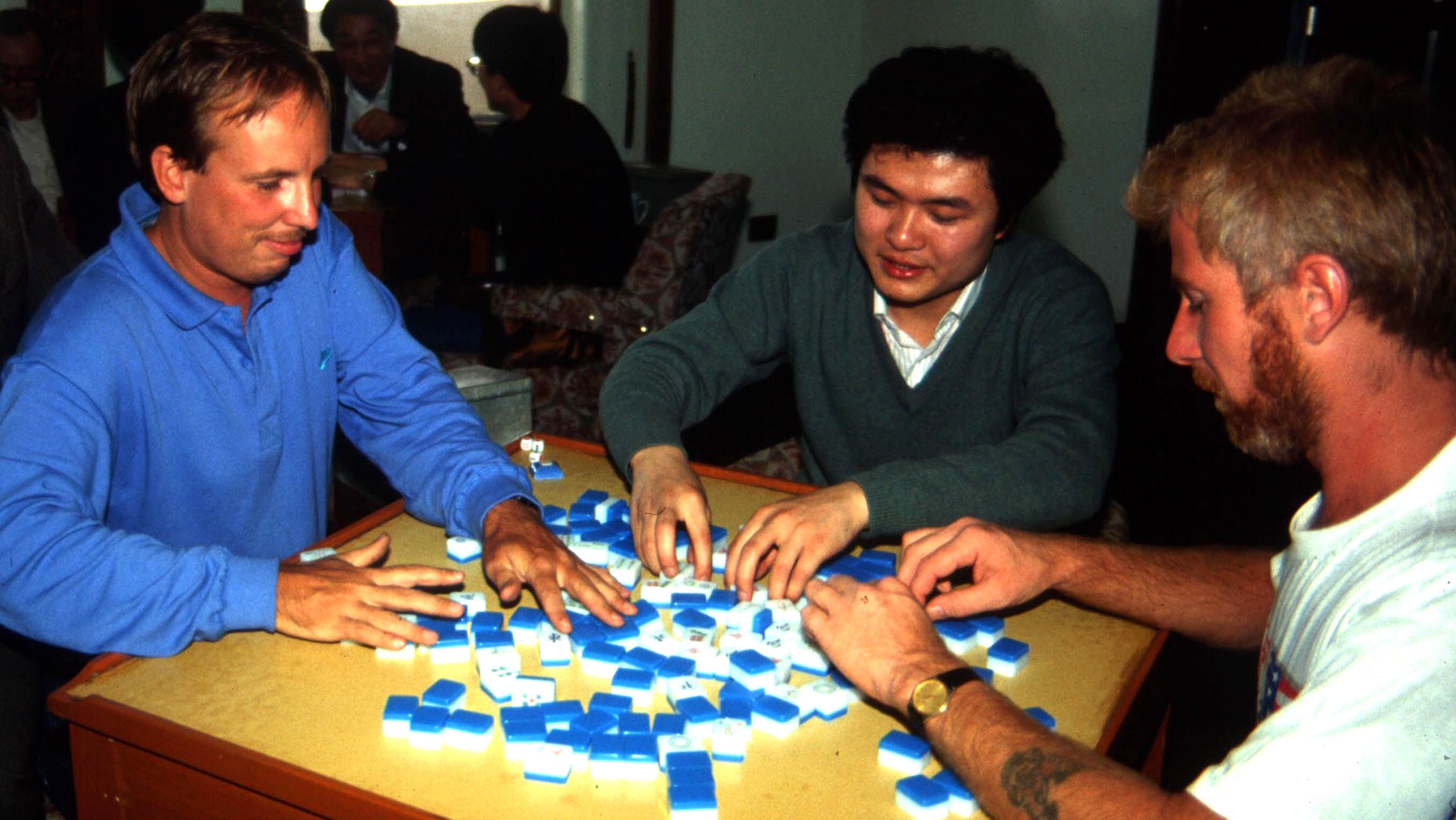
Players participating in the shuffle

All tiles are placed face down on the table and are shuffled. By convention, all players should participate in shuffling using both hands, moving the pieces around the table rigorously and loudly for a lengthy period. Tiles may get flipped up during this process, and players should flip them facing down as soon as possible to avoid identifying the location of any revealed tiles.

==== Stacking tiles ====
Walls with slight diagonal offset and player positions marked with cardinal directions, including the dealer (E), along with counting order

Each player then stacks a row of 18 tiles, two tiles high in front of them (for a total of 36 tiles). Players then push each side of their stack together to form a square wall.

Regular players usually place their stacks in a slightly diagonal position (about 20 to 30 degrees counter-clockwise); the right end of their stack is pushed somewhat further into the centre of the table to meet almost the middle of the stack of the player on the right. This creates a smaller square wall, the length of about half of each stack, with walls extended away from each corner of the square. The diagonally positioned stacks and a smaller square create a bigger space for players' tiles and also make an ergonomic position for drawing tiles from the stack.

==== Drawing tiles ====
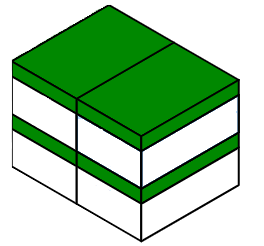
Stack of four mahjong tiles whilst dealing from the wall

The dealer throws three dice on the square wall and sums up the total. Counting counter-clockwise so that the dealer is 1 (or 5, 9, 13, 17), so that south (player to the right) is 2 (or 6, 10, 14, 18), etc., a player's quarter of the wall is chosen. Some house rules may use only two dice but have double throws to increase randomness. In the case of double throws, the player of the selected wall makes the second throw.

Using the exact total on the dice (or the total of the two throws), the player whose wall is chosen then counts the stacks of tiles from right to left. (For double throws, the count may extend to the left side player's stack.) This determines the location where the 'deck' of tiles is cut. Starting from the left of the stacks counted, the dealer draws four tiles for their hand. Proceeding in counter-clockwise order, players take turns drawing blocks of four tiles (so that the stacks decrease clockwise) until each player (including the dealer) has 12 tiles. Each player then draws one last tile (top first, then bottom, then following stack, etc. to make a 13-tile hand. The tile to be drawn is always the topmost tile left of the cut.

While drawing the 13th piece to complete the initial hand, the dealer (E) will typically also draw a 14th piece (both highlighted in blue) to initiate the game.

Dealing does not have to be strictly this way and may be done quite differently based on house rules. Tiles may flip over when being dealt, and players should agree in advance on how to deal with the problem. Solutions include having the person who flipped the tile penalized points, shuffling the turned-over piece back into the wall somehow, allowing the player to whom the tiles were dealt to take the piece or not (meaning the dealer must take it as their 14th piece), or other house rules.

Each player now sets aside any flowers or seasons they may have drawn and takes turns to draw replacement tiles from the wall in the counter-clockwise direction from the dealer (the way this is done varies, but can be as simple as first-come, first-served). In some rules, if a player gets any flowers or season tiles in the replacement draw, the players must wait for the next turn to draw replacement tiles.

==== Game play starts ====
The dealer draws a piece from the wall in a clockwise direction, adding it to their hand. Typically, this draw is performed during the initial deal to speed up play. If this does not complete a legal hand, the dealer then discards a piece (throwing it into the middle of the wall with no particular order in mind).

=== Rules ===
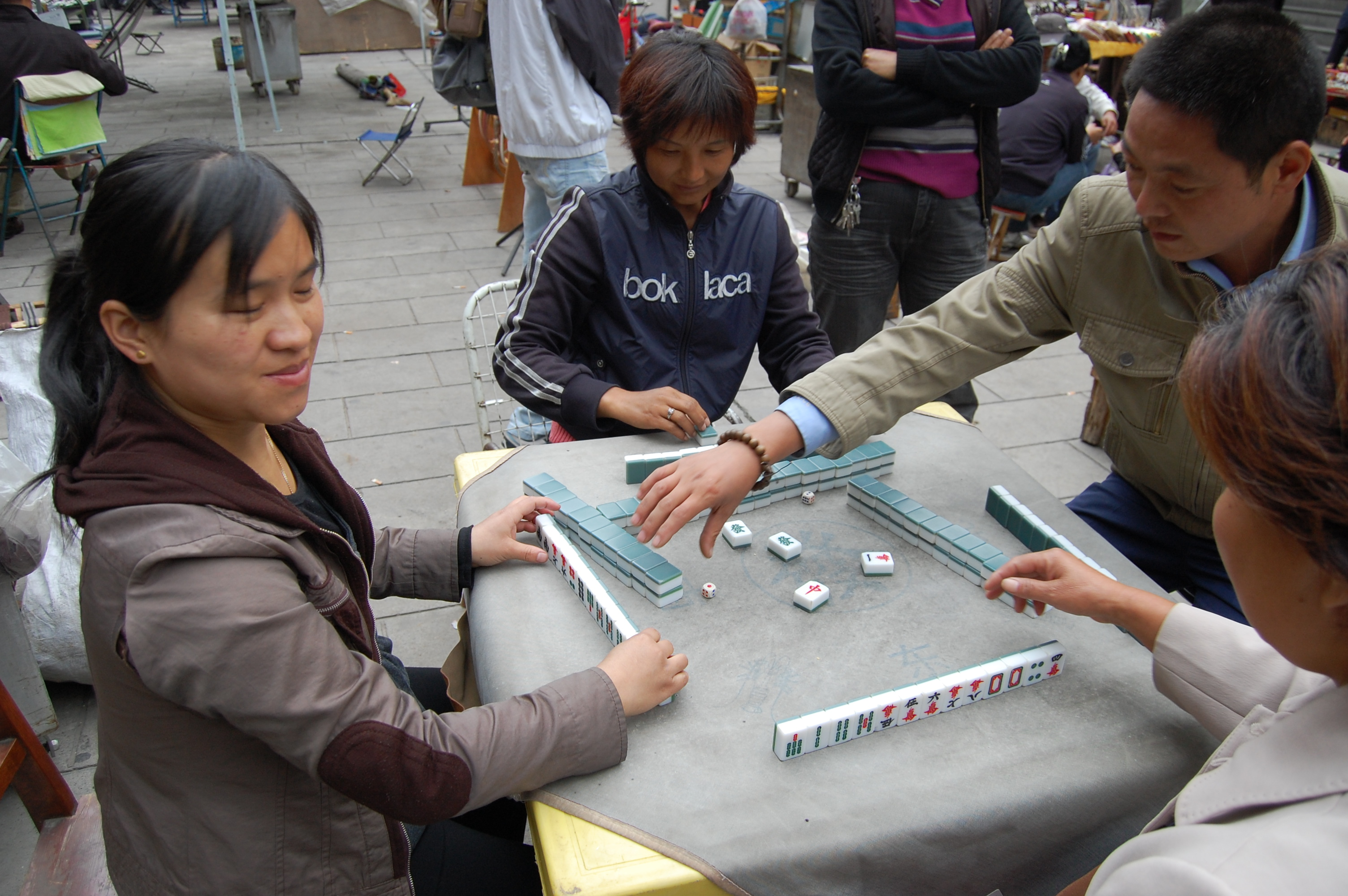
Local play on the street in Lanzhou

Each player, in turn, in a counter-clockwise direction, draws a tile from the wall. When drawing, continue around the wall, taking one piece from the wall (from where you last left off after dealing the tiles), top first. If that is taken, then the bottom one, moving in the same direction the tiles were dealt (counter-clockwise). The player then discards a tile (either the tile just drawn, or a tile in the hand) to maintain a hand of 13. The discarded tile is thrown into the centre and, if desired, the player announces out loud what the piece is. The other players have an opportunity to seize the discarded tile if they can make a meld with it; if no one takes it, the turn continues to the next player. Play continues this way until one player has a legal winning hand and calls out the win (each region does this call differently—no Asian version uses the word "mahjong" to signal a win) while revealing their hand. Playing in English, players will usually shout out Mahjong!

There are four different ways that regular order of play can be interrupted:

1. A bonus tile (flower or season) is drawn
2. A meld (pung, kong, or chow) is made from a seized discard (only from the most recent discard)
3. Going mahjong (declaring a winning hand)
4. Robbing a kong

During play, each player's hand should always be 13 tiles (meaning in each turn a tile must be picked up and another discarded). The count of 13 tiles do not include any bonus tiles (flowers and seasons), which are set to the side, nor does it include the fourth added piece of a kong. If a player is seen to have fewer or more than 13 tiles in their hand outside of their turn, they are penalised.

==== Legal hand ====
A winning hand consists of 14 tiles. Since players always have 13 tiles in their hand during play, they must win by either drawing a piece from the wall that completes a 14-tile hand ("winning from the wall") or claiming a discard from another player, which completes a 14-tile hand ("winning by discard"). The winning hand is made of four melds (a specific pattern of three pieces) and the eyes (a pair of identical pieces). The exceptions to this rule are the special hands listed below.

Most players play with a table minimum, meaning a winning hand must score a minimum number of points (which can be seen in the scoring section). In Hong Kong mahjong, the most common point set is three, but it can be higher or lower depending on house rules.

==== Melds ====
Melds are groups of tiles within the player's hand, consisting of either a pung (three identical tiles), a kong (four identical tiles), a chow (three tiles of the same suit in numerical sequence), or eyes (two identical tiles needed in a winning hand). Melds may be formed by drawing a tile from the wall, or by seizing another player's discard. There are rules governing which player has priority for a discard, and whether the meld should be exposed (displayed to all players) or remain concealed, depending on the manner in which the meld is formed.

- A pung is a set of three identical tiles. For example:,,, or. A pung may be formed with any suited or honors tile. Bonus tiles (flowers or seasons) cannot be used to form a pung because they are set aside and there are not three identical bonus tiles in the set. The tiles must be identical (not of different suits). A pung may either be concealed (formed by drawing tiles) or exposed (formed by seizing another player's discard).
- A kong is a complete set of four identical tiles. For example: or. Consider a kong the same as a pung with an additional tile to make a complete set of four. There are three ways to form a kong.
  1. Concealed kong – If a player holds three matching tiles (concealed pung) and, upon drawing a tile, completes a set of four, they may declare a kong. They do so by revealing the meld and placing two pieces in the middle face up and two pieces on the ends face down.
  2. Exposed kong – If a player can use a discarded tile to complete three matching tiles (concealed pung) in their hand, they can take the piece and reveal an "exposed kong" or "melded kong". The player reveals their three pieces face up and places the stolen discard on top of the middle tile, or face down next to the three other face-up pieces.
  3. Exposed kong from exposed pung – If a player already has a melded pung and then later in the game draws the fourth piece from the wall, they may announce (then or later in the game) a kong by placing the fourth tile on top of the middle piece of the melded pung, or all four tiles placed face up in a row. If a pung has been melded a player cannot steal the fourth piece if another player discards it – it must be drawn.
  Whenever a kong is formed, that player must draw an extra tile from the end of the wall and then discard a tile. The fourth piece of a kong is not considered one of the 13 tiles a player must always have in their hand. A kong may not be formed from bonus tiles (flowers/seasons), since the set does not include four identical tiles. Kongs are worth collecting to score more points and deprive opponents of the opportunity to obtain specific tiles.
- A chow is a meld of three suited tiles in sequence. For example:,,, or. The meld must be in absolute numerical sequence and all in the same suit. Players cannot skip numbers or meld from the 8 or 9 to 1 or 2. Honors tiles cannot be used to make chows because they have no numerical value, and bonus tiles (flowers and seasons) also cannot be used to make a chow. A player can steal a discard to form a chow only from the player whose turn was immediately before theirs; however, a player forming a chow from a seized piece has the lowest priority for that tile. Any other player who needs that tile to make a pung, make a kong, or to win may seize that piece instead. Like the pung, the chow is either concealed (formed by drawing tiles) or exposed (formed by seizing the prior player's discard).
- The eyes (also known as a pair) are two identical tiles which are an essential part of a legal winning hand. A piece cannot be stolen (melded) to form a pair of eyes unless the player simultaneously completes a legal winning hand. For example:,,,, or.

==== Interruption of play ====
The regular counter-clockwise order of turns may be interrupted for four events:

===== 1. Flower or season =====
Whenever a player draws a flower or season, it is announced and then placed to the side (it is not considered a part of the 13-tile hand, but in the event that the player wins, they may earn bonus points for them), and the last tile of the wall is drawn as a replacement tile so that the player has the 14 pieces needed before their discard. This may happen successively in a player's turn; each one needs to be set aside, and a new tile taken from the wall.

===== 2. Melding by seizing a tile from another player's discard =====
When a player discards a tile, other players may seize the tile to complete a meld. Seizing tiles has both advantages (quickly forming a winning hand and scoring extra points) and disadvantages (being forced to reveal part of one's hand to other players and not being able to change the meld once declared).

When a meld (pung, kong, or chow) is declared through seizing a discard, the player must state the type of meld to be declared and expose the meld by placing the three (or four) tiles face up. The player must then discard a tile, and play continues to the right of that player (this can disrupt the turn order). If the player who melds a discard is not directly after the discarder (in order of play), one or two players will essentially miss their turn as play continues counter-clockwise from the player who declared the meld.

If multiple players call for a discarded tile, priority for the discard depends on the declared action of the player stealing the discard.

1. Highest priority goes to the player who needs the discarded tile to win the hand. This can be done when any player discards a tile. If multiple players can win using the discard tile, then the player with the most faan value wins. If that is equal, then the player closest to the player who discarded in turn order takes the tile and wins the hand.
2. Next priority goes to the player who declares a pung or kong using the discard. A player who calls for a pung or kong may take the discard from any other player. Only one player can be in this position because there are only four of any tile in a mahjong set.
3. If no one calls out a winning hand by using the discard, nor a pung/kong, then the player to the right of the player who discarded (the next player in order) can take the tile, if they wish and can, to form a chow using the discard. Players may only call for a chow from the discard of the player immediately prior to them unless the tile is the final one required to win the hand.

===== 3. Winning a hand =====
The act of winning a hand interrupts play to assess the validity of the hand won. Upon confirmation, the player is awarded the hand's value per the specific game's rule, and points are settled.

====== From a discard ======
If at any point in the game a player can use another player's discard to complete a legal hand (and with the agreed minimum points), they declare a win and reveal their winning hand. This ends the hand, and scoring commences. If more than one player can use a discard to win the hand, there are multiple ways to handle the situation based on agreed table rules: The players might count the points they would win with the discard and the winner is the one with the higher score, the winner might simply be the player closest to the discarder in order of turn, or multiple players may be granted the win simultaneously.

====== From the wall ======
Alternatively, a player may also win by drawing a tile that completes a legal hand. This is called "winning from the wall". In Hong Kong mahjong, winning from the wall doubles the number of base points each loser must pay.

====== False win ======
Technically, the declaration for winning a hand may be made at any time. However, the player must have a complete and legal hand. Otherwise, the player is penalized. The penalty depends on the table rules. The player may forfeit points to the other players. Another potential penalty is the player who called out the false win must play the rest of the hand with their tiles face up on the table so other players can see them (open hand). Some methods apply the penalty at the end of the entire game. Again, the table rules dictate the enforcement of the penalty.

===== 4. Robbing a kong =====
A rarely occurring and high-scoring feature of Hong Kong mahjong is a move called robbing the kong. If a player declares a kong by adding a fourth piece to a melded pung but another player can use that piece to complete a hand, the completing player takes priority to win the hand and may steal that piece from the player who intended to declare the kong and wins the hand. Their winning hand will usually either form a chow with that piece or a special limit hand.

==== Examples of winning hands ====
Below are two examples of winning hands. A winning hand must consist of four melds (pungs, kongs, or chows) and a pair (eyes) and must also score the agreed table minimum.

- This hand is formed with four pungs and the eyes (pair) of east wind. Only bamboo is used (no other suited tiles), scoring extra points (clean hand). No chows are used (an all pung/kong hand scores extra points).
- A high-scoring hand formed using only circles is known as a pure hand. The hand is made of chows, pungs, and the eyes of circles.

Most players include table variations in their games, of which some non-standard are included. The hands of seven different pairs and 13 orphans are examples that do not have four melds and the eyes. They are described in more detail below.

==== Repeated hands ====
If the dealer wins the hand, they will remain the dealer, and an extra hand is played in addition to the minimum 16 hands in a match.

An extra hand is also played if there is no winner by the time all the accessible tiles in the wall have been drawn. When there is no winner, it is known as a goulash hand. Depending on the table rules, the winner of the next game may take an agreed number of points from each player, carrying over the points from the non-winning hand to the winning one. If there are two or three goulash hands in a row, then the winner would collect a considerable number of points from each player on top of their scoring hand. Because extra hands may be played every time a dealer wins or if there is a goulash hand, a match of 16 hands can easily become a match of 20 or even much more.

As table rules add a large amount of flexibility for players, they can choose to disregard the rule of extra hands and pass on the dealership regardless of who wins or if it results in a goulash hand. This puts a maximum estimated limit on the game duration and provides some amount of predictability.

==== Rhythm of play ====
Players may agree on table rules if the pace of the game is brisk or leisurely. For brisk games players may agree that a couple seconds after a discard are allowed for a "window of opportunity" before the next player picks up from the wall. Usually it is agreed once the next player has waited the duration of the "window of opportunity" and draws a tile from the wall, the previous discard is lost and cannot be claimed.

=== Scoring ===
Old Hong Kong scoring is relatively simple. There is only one winner (or if there is a draw, the hand is replayed). The winner must have a legal hand that meets the minimum faan points agreed to in advance (not including any bonus points). Only the winner scores, and the other players pay the winner various sums. After each hand ends, the winner counts their faan points.

- Faan points depend on:
  - The composition of the entire hand
  - How the hand was won
  - Bonus tiles
  - Special patterns
  - A few other special criteria.
- In order to win, a player needs to have at least the minimum faan value agreed in advance (often 3). Bonus tiles and a few other elements are not included in the minimum faan value a player needs to form a legal winning hand. For example, in a three faan minimum game, if a player has two faan points and one bonus point, the player has not met the proper requirements to win and will need to gain another faan point before calling a win. Though the bonus points cannot be included in the minimum points needed to win, they are included in the overall score after a player wins.
- The other players do not score their hand. Once the winner has added their points (faan points plus bonus points), the points must be converted into base points (the chart is below). These base points represent how much the opponents pay to the winner.
- Players then pay the winner (in money or when not gambling with "chips or points") based on three factors:
  - The base points (faan points and bonus points converted into a payment unit)
  - If the player won from the wall (doubles the points)
  - If the player was the dealer (doubles the points).

==== Concealed vs. revealed meld and hand ====
A concealed meld is one that contains no tiles stolen from another player's discard. A concealed hand is one made up of only concealed melds. Many variations distinguish between a concealed hand (winning from the wall) and a semi-concealed hand (the last tile is a stolen discard). In most mahjong variations, having a concealed hand can be valuable in scoring. Hong Kong mahjong does not especially reward concealed melds/hands except for a few cases: limit hands or half-limit hands (thirteen orphans, heavenly gates, four concealed pungs), as well as a complete hand (seven pairs), and with several melds (three concealed pungs).

Meld summary
Meld Type	Quantity	Eligible tiles			Allowed to be completed by ...	
Meld Type	Quantity	Suited	Honors	Bonus	Drawing	Seizing a discard
Pung	3 (identical set)	Yes Yes	Yes Yes	No No	Concealed	Exposed
Kong	4 (identical set)	Yes Yes	Yes Yes	No No	Concealed (add to concealed pung)	Exposed (add to concealed pung)
Kong	4 (identical set)	Yes Yes	Yes Yes	No No	Exposed from exposed (add to exposed pung)	Exposed (add to concealed pung)
Chow	3 (consecutive within suit)	Yes Yes	No No	No No	Concealed	Exposed (only from preceding player)
Eyes	2 (identical set)	Yes Yes	Yes Yes	No No	For the win, if hand has sufficient value	Only permitted to complete a winning hand

==== Faan value ====
===== Basic faan value =====
A winning hand must include an agreed minimum amount of faan value (often 3). Some examples of scoring include:

Sample faan scoring
Type	Item	Faan value
Basic	A pung/kong of dragons	1
Basic	A pung/kong of seat wind or round wind	1
Basic	All suited	1
Basic	Common hand: All chows and a pair of suited tiles	1
Basic	All-pung (kong) hand: Only pungs/kongs and any pair	3
Basic	Clean hand: Only one suit (bamboos, circles, or characters) with honors	3
Advanced	3 concealed pungs/kongs	3
Advanced	3 kongs	3
Advanced	7 pairs (special pattern)	4
Advanced	Pure hand: only one suit and no honors (only circles, bamboos or characters)	7
Advanced	Little dragons: 2 pungs of dragons and a pair of the third dragon	5
Advanced	Little winds: 3 pungs of winds and a pair of the fourth wind	6

===== Bonus faan =====
Bonus faan by manner of winning (not counted towards the minimum faan needed)
Item	Faan value
Winning from the wall	1
Robbing the kong	1
Winning on the last tile from the wall or its subsequent discard	1

Bonus faan from flowers and seasons (not counted towards the minimum faan needed)
Item	Faan value
No flower or season tiles in hand	1
Having own flower (seat flower)	1
Having own season (seat season)	1
All four flowers	2 (plus 1 for own flower)
All four seasons	2 (plus 1 for own season)
All eight flowers and seasons	Automatic win with maximum payment

A player only scores a bonus faan for flowers or seasons if it is their own flower or season (East=1, South=2, West=3 and North=4) or if the player has all four flowers or all four seasons (scoring 5 faan in total).

==== Payment ====
The losers pay the winning player points based on several criteria, and depending on whether the game is for fun or for money. How points are reckoned is agreed by players beforehand. For example, they can keep a tally, exchange chips, or pay one another with money. The faan value of a hand is converted into base points, which are then used to calculate the points the losers pay the winner. The table is progressive, doubling the number of base points when reaching a certain faan point target. The following is the Old Hong Kong simplified table; for other tables, see Hong Kong mahjong scoring rules.

Base points (Old Hong Kong Simplified)
Faan points	Base points
3	1
4	2
5	2
6	2
7	4
8	4
9	4
10+	8 (limit)

This table is based on play where 3 faan is the minimum needed in order to win with a legal hand. If a player has 3 faan, then their hand is worth one base point. A winning hand with 9 faan is worth four base points. Losing players must give the winning player the value of these base points. The following special cases result in doubled base points:

- If the winner wins from the wall, their base points are doubled.
- If the hand was won by discard, the discarder doubles the amount they owe the winner.
- If the winner is east, all losers double the base points.
- If the east player is a losing player, they pay double the points to the winner.

If two of these criteria apply to any player, they must double and then redouble the points owed to the winner.

===== Examples =====
Hand	Player	Base points
1	West wins with 3 faan (scoring 1 base point) from the wall (doubling value)	
1	East (dealer)	1 (base points) ×2 (doubling for winning from wall) ×2 (doubling for being east) = −4
1	South	1 (base points) ×2 (doubling for winning from wall) = −2
1	West	4 (from east) + 2 (from south) + 2 (from north) = +8
1	North	1 (base points) ×2 (doubling for winning from wall) = −2
2	North wins with 6 faan (2 base points) on a discard from south (double penalty to South)	
2	East (dealer)	2 (base points) ×2 (doubling for being east) = −4
2	South	2 (base points) ×2 (discarding winning piece) = −4
2	West	2 (base points) = −2
2	North	4 (from east) + 4 (from south) + 2 (from west) = +10
3	East wins with 10 faan (8 base points) on discard from west (double penalty to West)	
3	East (dealer)	16 (from south) + 32 (from west) + 16 (from north) = +64
3	South	8 (base points) ×2 (paying to east) = −16
3	West	8 (base points) ×2 (paying to east) ×2 (discarding winning piece) = −32
3	North	8 (base points) ×2 (paying to east) = −16

Hong Kong mahjong is essentially a payment system of doubling and redoubling, where winning from the wall adds great value to the final payment and where the dealer is highly rewarded or penalised if they win or lose.

==== Limit hands ====
In Hong Kong mahjong there are a series of "limit hands". These are exceptional hands, difficult to obtain, and are very valuable in point scoring. As many table rules put a limit on the number of points a winner's hand can score, full limit hands score that maximum. Table rules dictate if these rare and special hands are allowed, which ones, and the limit for scoring. A common scoring limit is 64 points, which is the highest base points doubled twice. A winner receives the scoring limit from each player without any doubling.

Some limit hands by necessity must be completely concealed (no discards used) or semi-concealed (the only discard used is the one needed to win). This includes the 13 orphans, 4 concealed pungs, heavenly hand and earthly hand. It is usually expected that the heavenly gates hand be concealed or semi-concealed. As for the dragon limit hands and the great winds, table rules dictate whether the hand must be concealed or not. Some table rules claim that a semi-concealed hand (winning from a discard) scores a half-limit.

Some groups also play with the "great flowers" rule. If a player picks up all four flowers and all four seasons during their hand, they instantly win the hand and receive the maximum points from all of the players. This is exceptionally rare.

In all the hands that require pungs, each pung can be replaced by the corresponding kong.

Limit Hands (Maximum number of fan agreed)
Hand	Explanation with example
天糊 Heavenly hand	The dealer draws a winning hand at the beginning of the game.
地糊 Earthly hand	A player completes a winning hand with the dealer's first discard (in most variants, provided the dealer does not draw a kong).
十三么 Thirteen orphans	1 and 9 of each suit, one of each wind, one of each dragon, and one extra piece of any of those thirteen elements
十三么 Thirteen orphans	🀀 🀁 🀂 🀃 🀄︎ 🀅 🀆 🀐 🀘 🀇 🀏 🀙 🀡
么九 Terminals	Only 1s and 9s.
么九 Terminals	🀇 🀘 🀐 🀏 🀙
綠一色 Pure green hand	All tiles are green in color, i.e. they can only comprise pungs, sequences and eye using 2, 3, 4, 6, 8 of bamboo or green dragon (not recognized in all games)
綠一色 Pure green hand	🀑 🀒 🀓 🀕 🀗 🀅
九蓮寶燈 Nine Gates	1112345678999 of any suit (that is, 1 to 9 plus two additional 1s and 9s); any one extra piece of the same suit suffices to win. This hand always has 4 melds (either 1 pung and 3 chows or 2 pungs and 2 chows, depending on the extra) and the eyes. In the example below, there are two pungs (111 and 999), two chows (234 and 678), and the extra 5 forms the eyes.
九蓮寶燈 Nine Gates	🀇 🀈 🀉 🀊 🀋 🀌 🀍 🀎 🀏
四暗刻 Self triplets	Four concealed pungs, plus eyes
十八羅漢 All kongs	Four kongs, plus eyes
十八羅漢 All kongs	🀐 🀜 🀕 🀆 🀡
大四喜 Great winds	A pung of each wind, plus eyes
大四喜 Great winds	🀀 🀁 🀂 🀃 🀐
七對子 Seven pairs	A special winning hand that comprises any seven pairs/eyes (not recognized in all games)
七對子 Seven pairs	🀀 🀁 🀂 🀃 🀐 🀘 🀋

==== Other examples of high-scoring hands ====
Other special high-scoring hands
Hand	Explanation with example
對對糊 All pungs / kongs	All melds are pungs and/or kongs. (3 faan)
對對糊 All pungs / kongs	🀐 🀜 🀕 🀆 🀡
混一色 Clean hand / Mixed suit	Hand consists of only a single suit and honors tiles. The Pearl, Jade, and Ruby Dragon limit hands (using white, green or red dragon tiles respectively) are special instances of clean hands. (3 faan)
混一色 Clean hand / Mixed suit	🀇 🀈 🀉 🀁 🀊 🀋 🀌 🀏 🀄︎
清一色 Pure suit hand	All tiles are the same suit. (7 faan)
清一色 Pure suit hand	🀐 🀑 🀒 🀓 🀔 🀕 🀖 🀗 🀘
混么九 Mixed terminals	Only 1s and 9s, and honor tiles. (5 faan)
混么九 Mixed terminals	🀇 🀘 🀐 🀏 🀀
小三元 Little dragons	Two pungs of dragons and a pair of the third dragon. (5 faan)
小三元 Little dragons	🀄︎ 🀕 🀖 🀗 🀆 🀠 🀅
小四喜 Little winds	Three pungs of winds and a pair of the fourth wind. (6 faan)
小四喜 Little winds	🀀 🀋 🀌 🀍 🀂 🀃 🀁
字一色 All honors tiles	Only winds and dragons, no suited tiles (10 faan)
字一色 All honors tiles	🀄︎ 🀅 🀀 🀂 🀁
大三元 Great dragons	Pungs of all three dragons. (8 faan)
大三元 Great dragons	🀄︎ 🀅 🀆 🀑 🀒 🀓 🀍
槓上槓自摸 Win by double kong	Self-pick the winning tile by obtaining it in a replacement after a second consecutive kong. (9 faan)

== Variations ==
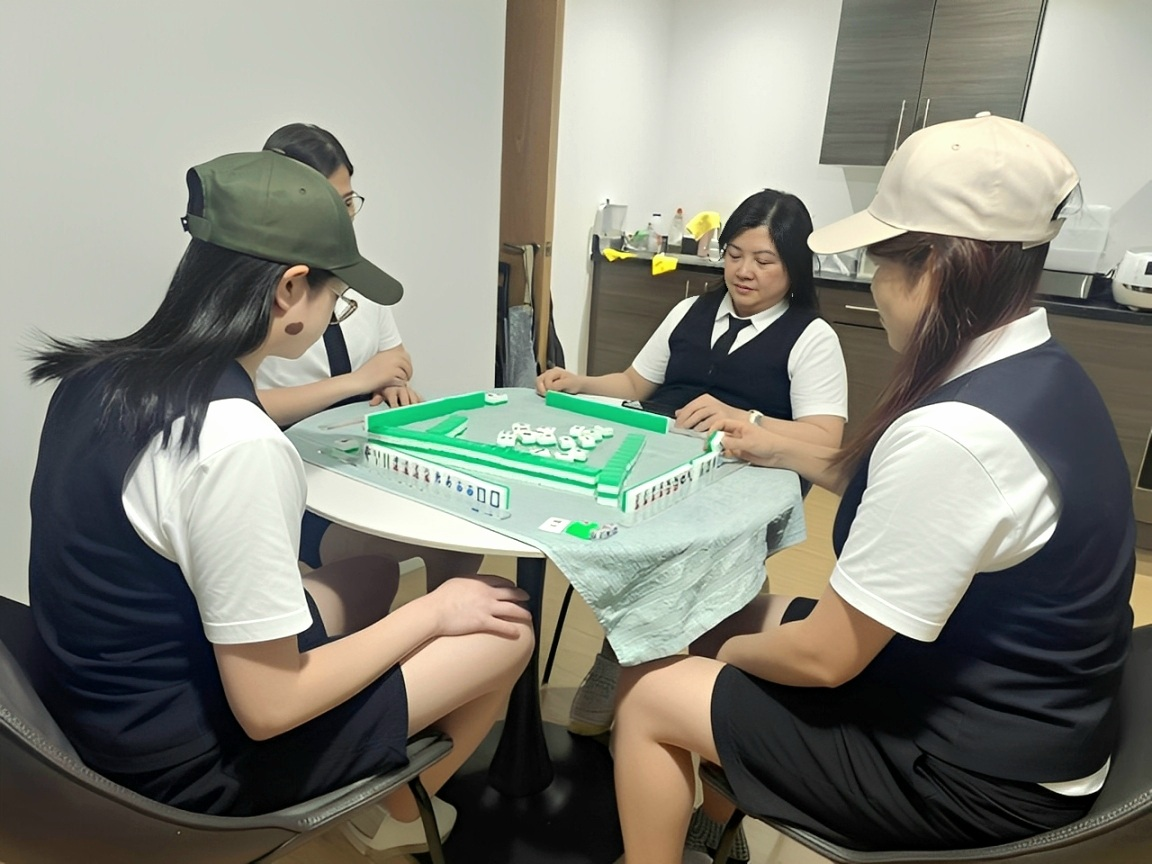
A typical four-player Hong Kong Mahjong game being played in an apartment

Video of an uncharacteristic five-player game

Variations may have far more complicated scoring systems, add or remove tiles, and include far more scoring elements and limit hands.

In many places, players often observe one version and are either unaware of other variations or claim that different versions are incorrect. In mainland China alone, there are over thirty variants, and across the world, there are over forty variations. Many variations today differ only by scoring.

=== Chinese variants ===
- Changsha mahjong is widely played in Hunan Province. Like Wuhan mahjong, players need to obtain special Jong consisting of only tiles of two, five or eight. Changsha mahjong forbids using winds and some special tiles, those tiles are first drawn out from the table when playing. Winners each round get a special drawing session for bonuses, usually doubling the score.
- Chinese classical mahjong is the oldest surviving variety of mahjong and was the version introduced to America in the 1920s under various names. It has a small, loyal following in the West, although few play it in Asia. All players score and it is possible to score higher than the winner.
- Fujian mahjong, thirteen tile hands. Certain tiles can be wild. No dragons. Winds are treated as bonuses.
- Harbin mahjong, popular in northeastern China, using only 108 suit and 4 red dragon tiles. The player's hand must meet a set of few conditions (e.g. at least one chow/pung, at least one terminal or red dragon, etc.) and be declared "ready" in order to win, with points earned by discard or self-draw and a bonus tile revealed when the player wins.
- Hong Kong mahjong or Cantonese mahjong is a more common form of mahjong, differing in minor scoring details from the Chinese Classical variety. It does not allow multiple players to win from a single discard.
- Mahjong Official Rules (Chinese: 麻将竞赛规则), commonly known as MCR or Chinese official mahjong, is an international standard founded by All-China Sports Federation in July 1998 and governed by the World Mahjong Organization. It includes a large variety of different scoring rules in a way that emphasizes strategy and calculation ability. Some mahjong societies have adopted it for competition play, and in some cases for all play. While not very popular in China and Asia, it is one of the most popular mahjong variants in Europe, particularly in the Netherlands, France and Italy.
- Shenyang mahjong, a fast-paced version with 13-tile hands. Valid winning hands must contain all 3 suits, honor or terminal tiles, and at least one open pung.
- Sichuan mahjong is a growing variety, particularly in southern China, disallowing chow melds, and using only the suited tiles. Play continues until a loser is decided or a draw. It can be played very quickly.
- Taiyuan Lisi mahjong, or Lisi (lit. 'Raise Four'): the players must win with the first four blocks drawn which are placed separately in front of the others. These four blocks cannot be touched until the player has a ready hand.
- Tianjin mahjong using normally seven jokers, with special scoring such as joker-free, joker-waiting-pair, catch-5, dragon, joker-suited-dragon.
- Wenzhou mahjong is an uncommon regional variation primarily played in Wenzhou of Zhejiang Province. It is played without the flower and season tiles. The most distinct feature is that it is played with 16 tile hands with an additional rule of determining a wild card tile (Caishen lit. 'God of fortune') which can substitute as another tile in the winning combination at the start of every hand.
- Wuhan mahjong is growing rapidly and become popular in southern China. It is different from other parts of China such that it has a tile that can be used as everything called Laizi, and the player has to have a set of special two tiles, namely two, five, eight, as prerequisite for winning. Another variation has become the new trend. Special tiles need to be discarded.
- Xiangyang mahjong is played with three players, and without winds, seasons, flowers and one suit of dots, bamboo and characters. It places special emphasis on the 5 tile giving extra points for any hand made using a 5 tile.

=== Other variants ===
- American mahjong is a derivative of mahjong, standardized and regulated by the U.S.-based National Mah Jongg League, Inc. and the American Mah-Jongg Association. Unlike other forms of Mahjong, permitted "legal" hands are changed annually through a published card that must be purchased by players from one of the sponsoring organizational bodies. It uses joker tiles, the Charleston, plus melds of five or more tiles, treats bonus tiles as honors, and eschews the chow and the notion of a standard hand. Purists claim that this makes American mahjong a separate game. In addition, the NMJL and AMJA variations, which have minor scoring differences, are commonly referred to as mahjongg or mah-jongg (with 2 Gs, often hyphenated).
- European classical mahjong is a family of European variants that remained closer to Chinese classical mahjong than most modern Chinese variants, some of which are still actively played today. Most notably:

- Dutch tournament rules (Nederlandse Toernooi Spelregels or NTS) are a ruleset formalized in 2002 that is now maintained by the Dutch Mahjong Federation. Although nowadays not as popular as MCR in the Netherlands, it is still actively played in local clubs, tournaments, and living rooms.
- Italian official rules (Regolamento Ufficiale Italiano) are a ruleset maintained by the Italian Mahjong Federation.

- Filipino mahjong is a fast-moving variant that uses the standard 144-tile set. It does not use jokers, and groups all dragon, wind, season, and flower tiles as "flowers" for the purpose of collecting bonus points.
- Japanese classical mahjong is still used in tournaments. It is closer to the Chinese classical scoring system but only the winner scores.
- Japanese mahjong is a standardized form of mahjong in Japan and South Korea. It is also found prevalently in video games, which helped make it one of the most widespread forms of mahjong worldwide, including in English-speaking countries and Europe. In addition to scoring changes, the rules of rīchi (ready hand) and dora (bonus tiles) are unique highlights of this variant. In addition, tile discards are specifically arranged in front of each player by discard order, to take discarded tiles into account during play. Some rules replace some number 5 tiles with red tiles so that they can eventually get more value.
- Pussers bones is a fast-moving variant developed by sailors in the Royal Australian Navy. It uses an alternative vocabulary, such as Eddie, Sammy, Wally, and Normie, instead of East, South, West, and North respectively.
- Singaporean mahjong and Malaysian mahjong are two similar variants with much in common with Hong Kong mahjong. Unique elements are the use of four animal bonus tiles (cat, mouse, cockerel, and centipede) as well as certain alternatives in the scoring rules, which allow payouts midway through the game if certain conditions (such as a kong) are met. Melds may also be presented in a form different from most other variations.
- South African mahjong is a variant of Cantonese mahjong. It is very similar in terms of game play and follows most of the rules and regulations of Cantonese mahjong. However, there are some minor differences in scoring, e.g. the limit on the maximum points a hand can be rewarded is three or four faan depending on the house rules. A chicken hand (gai wu) is normally considered a value hand. Depending on the house rules flowers may also be used to boost scoring.
- Taiwanese mahjong is the variety prevalent in Taiwan and involves hands of sixteen tiles (as opposed to the thirteen-tile hands in other versions), features bonuses for dealers and recurring dealerships, and allows multiple players to win from a single discard.
- Vietnamese mahjong has the same eight specialized jokers but with only eight different extra flowers for a total of 160 tiles. A modern variant triplicates or quadruplicates the jokers for a total of 176 or 184 tiles.
- Western classical mahjong is a descendant of the version of mahjong introduced by Babcock to America in the 1920s. Today, this term largely refers to the "Wright-Patterson" rules, used in the U.S. military, and other similar American-made variants that are closer to the Babcock rules.
- Zung Jung is a mahjong variant designed by statistician Alan Kwan, intended for both competitive and casual play. It has a scoring system informed by statistical mathematics, and a more streamlined and simplified ruleset than traditional variants. A slight modification of this ruleset was used in the World Series Of Mahjong tournament.
- Three-player mahjong (or 3-ka) is a simplified three-person mahjong that involves hands of 13 tiles (with a total of 84 tiles on the table) and may use jokers depending on the variation. Any rule set can be adapted for three players; however, this is far more common and accepted in Japan, Korea, Malaysia and the Philippines. It usually eliminates one suit entirely, or tiles 2–8 in one suit leaving only the terminals. It needs fewer people to start a game and the turnaround time of a game is short—hence, it is considered a fast game. In some versions there is a jackpot for winning in which whoever accumulates a point of 10 is considered to hit the jackpot or whoever scores three hidden hands first. The Malaysian and Korean versions drop one wind and may include a seat dragon.

- In Korean three-player mahjong, one suit is omitted completely (usually the bamboo set) as well as the Four Gentlemen. Winning combinations are similar to Japanese yaku (except Three Color Straight, Mixed Triplets, and All Terminals which are impossible) but with different base points, and reaching tenpai after first discard is also a winning combination. Bonus points are a bit more complicated, with specific tiles offering more bonus points in After a Kan, Under the Sea, or Under the River situations. The play is faster. No melded chows are allowed and concealed hands are common. Riichi (much like its Japanese cousin) is an integral part of the game as well.

=== Variant comparison ===
Mahjong variants
Variation	Hong Kong	MCR	Japanese 4 Player	Japanese 3 Player	Korean 3 Player	HK New	Wuhan	Taiwan	American	Classical	Singapore	Malaysian 4 Player	Malaysian 3 Player	Vietnam	Sichuan	Zung Jung
Characters	check	check	check	check	check	check	check	check	check	check	check	check	✗	check	check	check
Circles	check	check	check	check	check	check	check	check	check	check	check	check	check	check	check	check
Bamboo	check	check	check	check	check	check	check	check	check	check	check	check	✗	check	check	check
Dragons	check	check	check	check	check	check	check	check	check	check	check	check	check	check	✗	check
Winds	check	check	check	check	check	check	check	check	check	check	check	check	check	check	✗	check
Flowers	check	check	✗	✗	check	check	✗	check	check	check	check	check	check	check	✗	Optional
Seasons	check	check	✗	✗	check	check	✗	check	check	check	check	check	check	check	✗	Optional
Four Arts and Four Noble Professions /Emperors and Empresses	✗	✗	✗	✗	✗	✗	✗	✗	✗	✗	✗	check	✗	check	✗	✗
Animals	✗	✗	✗	✗	✗	✗	✗	✗	✗	✗	check	check	check	✗	✗	✗
Jokers	✗	✗	✗	✗	✗	✗	check	✗	check	✗	check	check	check	check	✗	✗
Scoring Base	Faan	Faan	Multipliers	Multipliers	Simple	Faan	Multipliers	Simple	American	Multipliers	Faan	Faan	Faan	Faan	Varies	Simple
Scoring	Winner	Winner	Winner	Winner	Winner	Winner	Winner	Winner	Winner	All	Winner	All	All	Winner	Varies	Winner
East Doubles	check	✗	check	check	✗	check	✗	check	check	check	check	check	check	✗	✗	✗
Sacred Discard (Furiten)	✗	✗	check	check	check	✗	✗	✗	✗	✗	✗	✗	✗	✗	✗	✗
Melded chows	check	check	check	✗	✗	check	check	check	✗	check	check	check	check	check	✗	check
Riichi	✗	✗	check	check	check	✗	✗	✗	✗	✗	✗	✗	✗	✗	✗	✗
Complete hand tiles	14	14	14	14	14	14	14	17	14	14	14	14	14	14	Varies	14
Minimum Points (in variations units)	3f	8	1y	1y	2p	5f	1f	7/10t	Varies	3f	2t	?	5f	?	Varies	0 or 5 pts

== Equipment ==
=== Tables ===
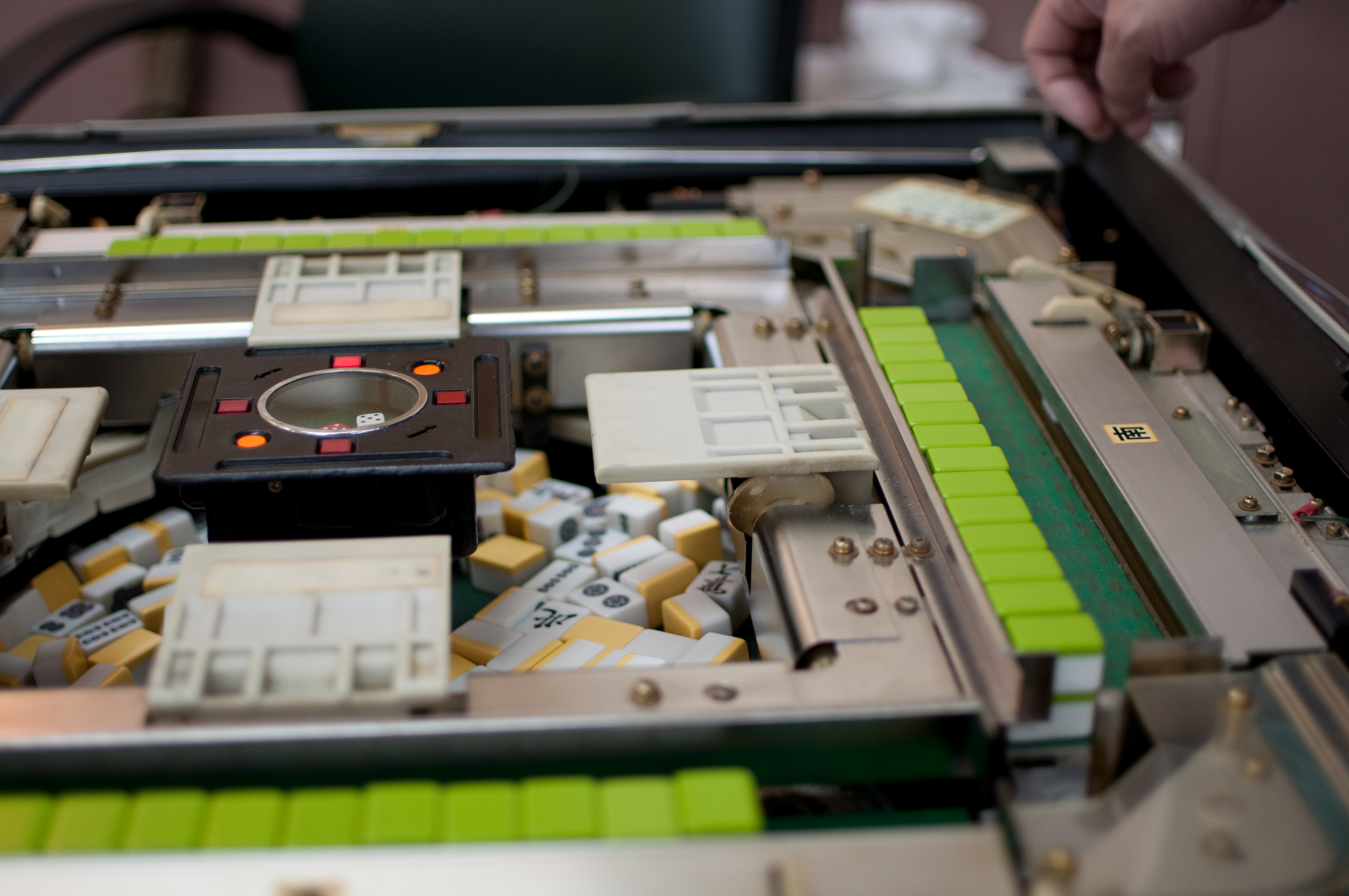
Interior of an automatic mahjong table.

Mahjong playing surfaces are typically square and small enough to be within arm's length of all equipment. The edges are raised to prevent tiles from sliding off and the surface is covered in felt to limit wear on the tiles. Automatic dealing tables, often used for high stakes playing and tournaments, are able to shuffle tiles, build walls, and randomize dice. It is an elaborate device built into a table which uses two alternating sets of tiles. It shuffles one set of tiles while the players play on the other set. Tiles made for automatic dealing tables contain magnets, so that the tiles will be face-down in the walls when the shuffle is complete. After the round is finished the tiles are dropped into the table and the standby wall raises upwards.

=== Tiles ===
The following chart shows the most generic set of tiles

		Numbers								
		1	2	3	4	5	6	7	8	9
Suits	Dots									
Suits	Bamboo									
Suits	Characters									
Honors/Bonus		Winds				Dragons			Bonus	
Honors/Bonus		East	South	West	North	Red	Green	White	Seasons	Flowers

There are variations that feature specific use of tiles. Some three-player versions remove the North wind and one Chinese provincial version has no honors. Korean mahjong removes the bamboo suit or at least its numbers 2–8 so that terminals can be used. Japanese mahjong rarely uses flowers or seasons. Korean mahjong uses seasons but calls them flowers, while many Southeast Asian sets have more flower series.

==== Wild cards and jokers ====
Some mahjong variants accept wildcard tiles. The wildcard tiles are decided at the beginning of the game by choosing one random tile. The wild card could be the immediately following tile on the wall, after distributing tiles to all players, or it could also be separately decided by a dice throw. Wildcard tiles cannot be discarded and can only replace tiles in chows. Wildcard tiles cannot replace tiles in pungs and kongs. For example, if a character 4 is chosen, then character 4 and the next sequential tile, character 5, can be used as wild cards in this round. (When the wildcard indicator is chosen and exposed, only 3 tiles remain of the same denomination, so the next tile in the suit will also be used as a wildcard, adding to 7 wildcard tiles for 4 players.) Also, if a tile numbered 9 is the indicator, the suits circle back to 1, after 9. Thus, the number 9 and 1 are wild cards.

Also, if the chosen tile is not in the suited tiles, the wild cards are decided in rules:

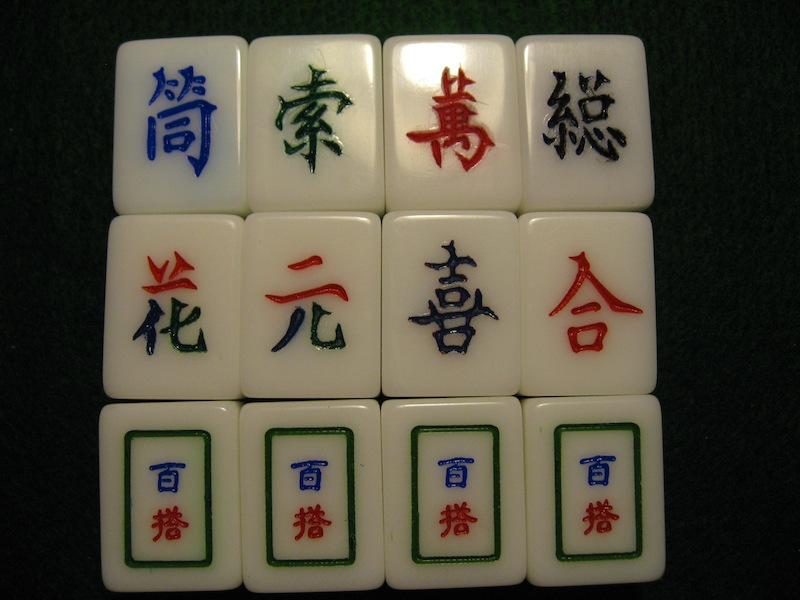
Top eight are Vietnamese jokers. Bottom four are Chinese.

Wild card tile chosen	Another wildcard
East	South
South	West
West	North
North	East
Red Dragon	Green Dragon
Green Dragon	White Dragon
White Dragon	Red Dragon

The bonus tiles are not available for wild cards.

A feature of several variations of mahjong, most notably in American mahjong, is the notion of some number of Joker tiles. They may be used as a wild card: a substitute for any tile in a hand, or, in some variations, only tiles in melds. Another variation is that the Joker tile may not be used for melding. Depending on the variation, a player may replace a Joker tile that is part of an exposed meld belonging to any player with the tile it represents.

Rules governing discarding Joker tiles also exist; some variations permit the Joker tile to take on the identity of any tile, and others only permit the Joker tile to take on the identity of the previously discarded tile (or the absence of a tile, if it is the first discard).

Joker tiles may or may not affect scoring, depending on the variation. Some special hands may require the use of Joker tiles (for example, to represent a "fifth tile" of a certain suited or honor tile).

In American mahjong, it is illegal to pass Jokers during the Charleston.

===== Flowers =====
Japanese rule sets discourage the use of flowers and seasons. Korean mahjong uses season tiles but calls them flowers. Three-player mahjong in the Japanese tradition use only seasons. In Singapore and Malaysia an extra set of bonus tiles of four animals are used. The rule set includes a unique function in that players who get two specific animals get a one-time immediate payout from all players. In Taiwanese mahjong, getting all eight flowers and seasons constitutes an automatic win of the hand and specific payout from all players.

Four of the flower tiles represent the four noble plants of Confucian reckoning:

- 🀢 plum,
- 🀣 orchid,
- 🀥 chrysanthemum,
- and 🀤 bamboo.

The other 4 flower tiles (or season tiles) represent seasons:

- 🀦 spring,
- 🀧 summer,
- 🀨 autumn,
- and 🀩 winter.

These animal tiles are used in Malaysia, Singapore and local variations. They represent the cat, mouse, rooster and centipede. Like flower tiles, they also function as bonus tiles. However, as they have no corresponding seat position, any player who draws one of these gets a bonus point.

===== Walls =====
All tiles are placed face down and shuffled. Each player then stacks a row of tiles two tiles high in front of them, the length of the row depending on the number of tiles in use:

- 136 tiles: 17 stacks for each player
  - Suits of circles, bamboos, and characters + winds + dragons
- 144 tiles: 18 stacks for each player
- 148 tiles: 19 stacks for dealer and player opposite, 18 for rest
- 152 tiles: 19 stacks for each player

=== Dice, markers, and counting pieces ===
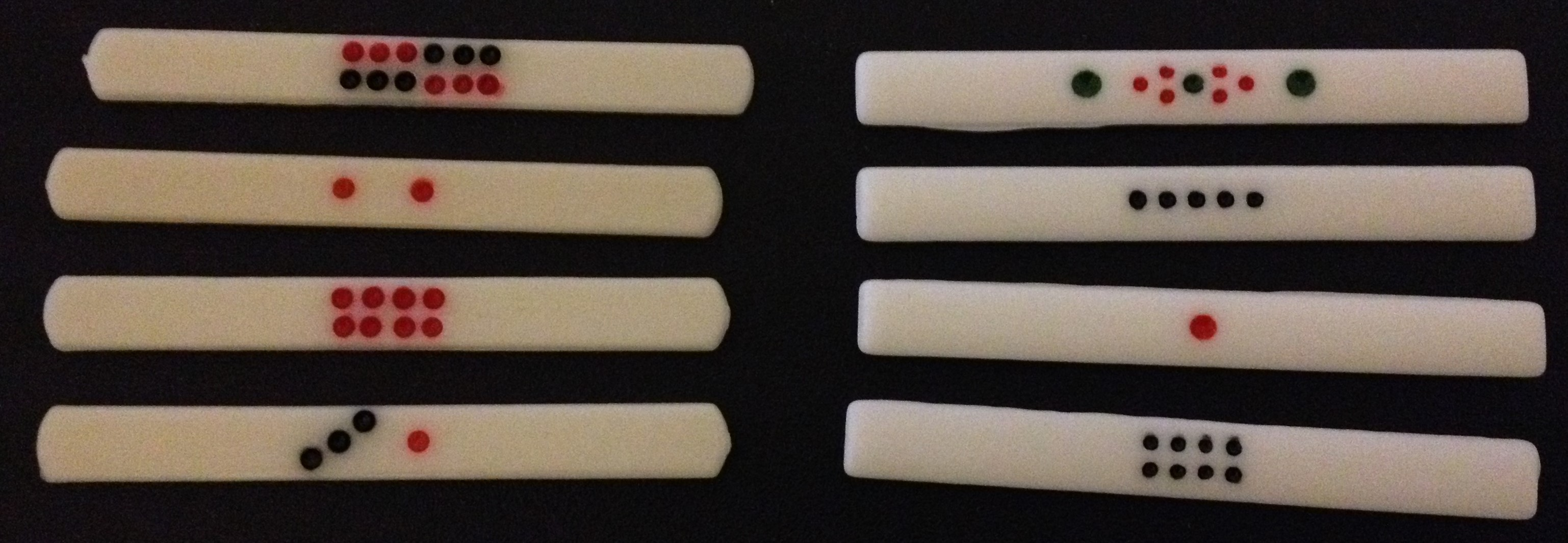
Mahjong counting sticks: Left are Chinese while the right are Japanese

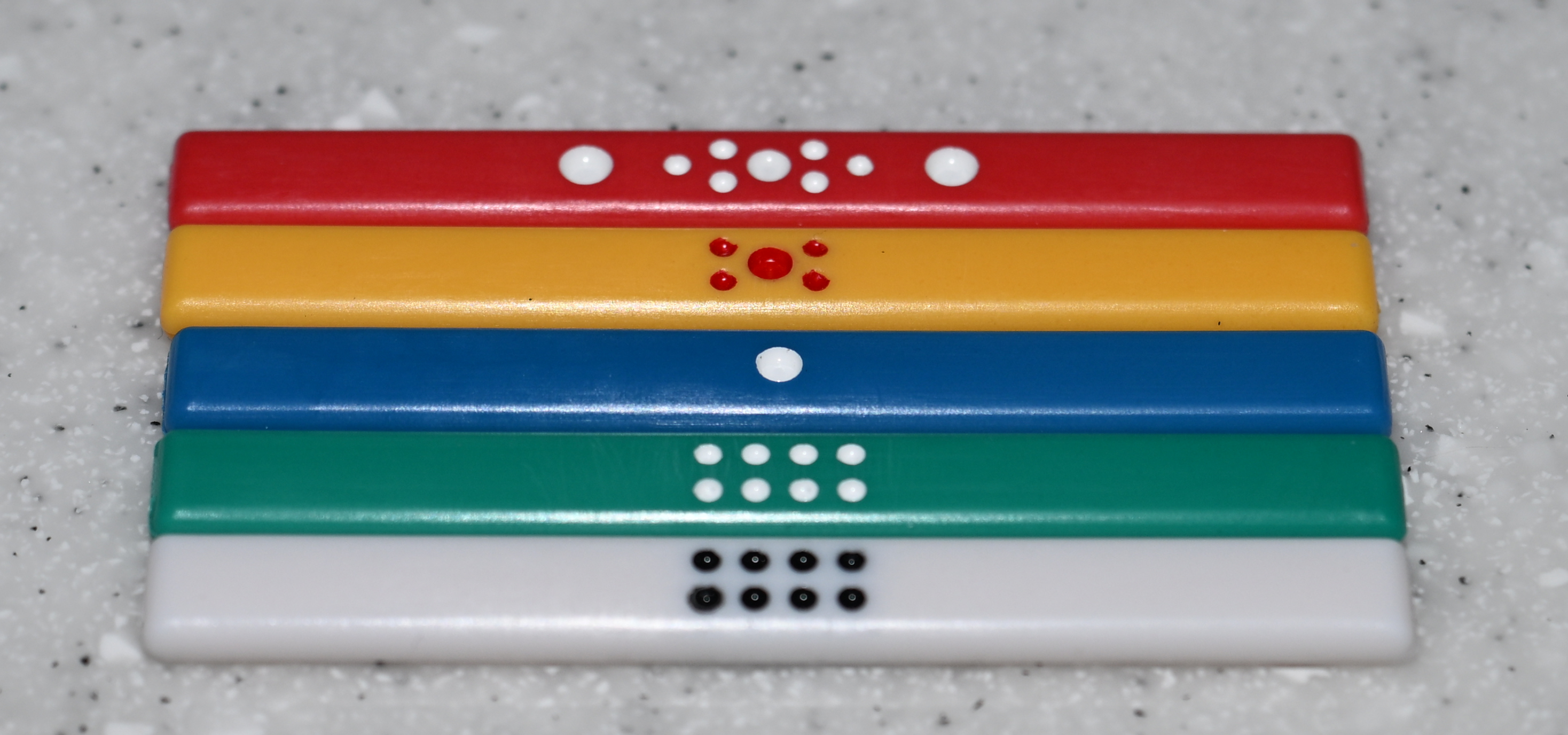
Colored Japanese mahjong counting sticks. Red is 10,000 points, yellow is 5,000 points, blue is 1,000 points, green is 500 points, and white is 100 points.

Depending on the variation, two or three dice are usually used to decide what part of the wall to start dealing from. They are six-sided dice, traditionally but not necessarily Chinese dice with red one and four pips.

The dealer marker is a round or square object that the dealer places to the side to remind players who the dealer is. The wind marker may be used which indicates the current prevailing wind. In some cases the dealer marker and the wind marker are represented by one large marker, usually a small wheel where one can swivel the outer circle to indicate the prevailing wind (which the dealer holds onto), a cube with the four winds placed onto four of the sides which can be placed in a hollow square (the dealer holds onto it), or a cylinder locked into frame which can be rolled to expose the wind on the top. Japanese mahjong, especially in a gambling environment, may optionally use four yakitori markers to indicate which players have not won a hand yet and have to pay a penalty.

There are a variety of counting pieces used in different countries. They range from Chinese or Japanese counting sticks (thin sticks with various dots on them to represent various points), jetons, play money, paper and pencil, or various apps on touchscreen devices used to calculate and keep scores.

== Glossary ==
English	Chinese	Japanese	Comment
Simples	simplified Chinese: 数牌; traditional Chinese: 數牌; pinyin: shùpái; Jyutping: sou^{3}paai^{2}	Japanese: 数牌; rōmaji: shūpai or sūpai	
Bamboo (Sticks, Strings)	Chinese: 索子; pinyin: suǒzi; Jyutping: sok^{3}zi^{2}	Japanese: 索子; rōmaji: sōzu	Originally means a string of cash.
Dots (Circles, Coins, Wheels, Stones)	Chinese: 筒子; pinyin: tǒngzi; Jyutping: tung^{4}zi^{2} simplified Chinese: 饼子; traditional Chinese: 餅子; pinyin: bǐngzi	Japanese: 筒子; rōmaji: pinzu	Originally meant cash coins.
Characters (Numbers, Myriads)	simplified Chinese: 万子; traditional Chinese: 萬子; pinyin: wànzi; Jyutping: maan^{6}zi^{2}	Japanese: 萬子; rōmaji: wanzu or manzu	Originally means 10000 cash coins.
Honors	Chinese: 字牌; pinyin: zìpái; Jyutping: zi^{6}paai^{2} Chinese: 番子; pinyin: fānzi; Jyutping: faan^{1}zi^{2}	Japanese: 字牌; rōmaji: tsūpai or jihai	
Winds	simplified Chinese: 风牌; traditional Chinese: 風牌; pinyin: fēngpái; Jyutping: fung^{1}paai^{2}	Japanese: 風牌; rōmaji: fonpai or kazehai	
Dragons	Chinese: 箭牌; pinyin: jiànpái; Jyutping: zin^{3}paai^{2}	Japanese: 三元牌; rōmaji: sangenpai; lit. 'three fundamental'	
White dragon	Chinese: 白板; pinyin: báibǎn; Jyutping: baak^{6}baan^{2}; lit. 'blank tile/to be stone-broke'	Japanese: 白; rōmaji: haku	
Red dragon	Chinese: 中; pinyin: zhōng; Jyutping: zung^{1}; lit. 'center or middle' simplified Chinese: 红中; traditional Chinese: 紅中; pinyin: hóngzhōng; Jyutping: hung^{4}zung^{1}; lit. 'red center'	Japanese: 中; rōmaji: chun	Originally a fifth Wind.
Green dragon	Chinese: 發; pinyin: fā; Jyutping: faat^{3}; lit. 'fortune' Chinese: 發財; pinyin: fācái; Jyutping: faat^{3}coi^{4}; lit. 'to get rich'	Japanese: 發; rōmaji: hatsu	Entered the set by 1890.
Chow	simplified Chinese: 顺子; traditional Chinese: 順子; pinyin: shùnzi; Jyutping: seon^{6}zi^{2}	Japanese: 順子; rōmaji: shūntsu or jūntsu	Run of three tiles from the same suit.
Pung	Chinese: 刻子; pinyin: kèzi; Jyutping: haak^{1}zi^{2}	Japanese: 刻子; rōmaji: kōtsu	Three identical tiles (three of a kind).
Kong	simplified Chinese: 杠子; traditional Chinese: 槓子; pinyin: gàngzi; Jyutping: gong^{3}zi^{2}	Japanese: 槓子; rōmaji: kantsu	Four identical tiles (four of a kind).
Concealed Kong (hidden Kong)	simplified Chinese: 暗杠; traditional Chinese: 暗槓; pinyin: àn gàng; Jyutping: am^{3}gong^{3}	Japanese: 暗槓子; rōmaji: ankantsu	
Forming a Chow from discard	(Mandarin) Chinese: 吃; pinyin: chī (Cantonese) Chinese: 上; Jyutping: soeng^{6}	Japanese: チー; rōmaji: chī	
Forming a Pung from discard	Chinese: 碰; pinyin: pèng; Jyutping: pung^{3}	Japanese: ポン; rōmaji: pon	
Forming a Kong	simplified Chinese: 杠; traditional Chinese: 槓; pinyin: gàng; Jyutping: gong^{3}	Japanese: カン; rōmaji: kan	
Calling a win	(Mainland China) Chinese: 和; pinyin: hú (Taiwan) Chinese: 胡; pinyin: hú (Cantonese) Chinese: 食糊; Jyutping: sik^{6}wu^{4}	Japanese: 和了; rōmaji: hōra Japanese: アガリ; rōmaji: agari	Declaring a completed hand.
Self-draw (from the wall)	Chinese: 自摸; pinyin: zìmō; Jyutping: zi^{6}mo^{1}	Japanese: ツモ or 自摸; rōmaji: tsumo Japanese: 自摸和; rōmaji: tsumoagari	Drawing the tile from the wall required to complete a legal hand on one's turn.
Calling a win from a discard		Japanese: ロン; rōmaji: ron Japanese: 栄和; rōmaji: ron'agari Japanese: 出和了り; rōmaji: deagari	
Discarding a tile from which another player calls a win	(Mandarin) Chinese: 放炮; pinyin: fàngpào (Cantonese) simplified Chinese: 出冲; traditional Chinese: 出衝; Jyutping: ceot^{1}cung^{1}	Japanese: 放銃; rōmaji: hōjū Japanese: 振り込み; rōmaji: furikomi Japanese: 当たり; rōmaji: atari	
Ready hand	(Mandarin) simplified Chinese: 听牌; traditional Chinese: 聽牌; pinyin: tìngpái (Cantonese) Chinese: 叫糊; Jyutping: giu^{3}wu^{4}	Japanese: テンパイ or 聴牌; rōmaji: tenpai	A hand that is one tile away from winning.
False Mahjong	(Mainland China) Chinese: 诈和; pinyin: zhàhú (Taiwan) Chinese: 詐胡; pinyin: zhàhú (Cantonese) Chinese: 詐糊; Jyutping: zaa^{3}wu^{4}	Japanese: 錯和; rōmaji: chonbo	Calling a win without a legal hand.
Short hand	Chinese: 小相公; pinyin: xiǎoxiànggōng; Jyutping: siu^{2}soeng^{3}gung^{1}	Japanese: 少牌; rōmaji: shōhai	Having too few tiles to win (e.g. if a player forgets to draw a tile after declaring a kong). In literal Chinese: "small husband".
Long hand	Chinese: 大相公; pinyin: dàxiànggōng; Jyutping: daai^{6}soeng^{3}gung^{1}	Japanese: 多牌; rōmaji: tahai	Having too many tiles to win (e.g. if a player draws a tile by mistake after calling a pung from a discard). In literal Chinese: "big husband".
Draw (goulash)	Chinese: 流局; pinyin: liújú; Jyutping: lau^{4}guk^{6} traditional Chinese: 荒莊; simplified Chinese: 荒庄; pinyin: huāngzhuāng	Japanese: 流局; rōmaji: ryūkyoku	When no player has won the round.

== See also ==
- Chinese playing cards
- Khanhoo
- Madiao
- Mahjong (Unicode block)
- Mahjong and artificial intelligence
- Mahjong solitaire:
  - Shanghai solitaire
  - Shisen-Sho
- Mahjong tiles
