= Hong Kong mahjong scoring rules =

Rules of Hong Kong variants of mahjong

In Hong Kong mahjong, when a player declares a winning hand, scoring proceeds in two stages. First, the winning hand is awarded a number of "faan"—a unit from the Cantonese term 番 (pinyin: fān / jyutping: faan1).

Second, faan are converted into scores for each player. When gambling with mahjong, these scores represent money. In this article, "points" refer exclusively to these scores (and not faan).

Most Hong Kong mahjong games require that players declaring a win to have 3 faan, but other minimums are possible. This generally increases the length of each game and allows more strategizing around discarding and forming melds.

== Counting faan ==
In Hong Kong mahjong, 13 faan is considered the absolute limit for faan, but players can set a lower ceiling to reduce stakes (e.g., 8 faan).

The general equation for the total faan of a winning hand is:

$$\text{Total Faan} = \begin{cases} \min(13, \text{Hand} + \text{Winning Condition}), \text{if hand is a limit hand,} \\ \min(13, \text{Hand} + \text{Wind and Dragon} + \text{Flower} + \text{Winning Condition}), \text{if otherwise.} \end{cases}$$

High-scoring hands (Chinese: 例牌, translated to "limit hands" in this article) are only scored based on the hand and winning conditions, but not winds, dragons, or flowers.

=== Hand Faan ===
The contents of the hand are most important for awarding faan. Typically, a rarer hand is worth more points, but this may not be the case.

If multiple criteria are satisfied, the points awarded under each criterion are stacked together.

The tables following list the criteria for scoring the contents of the hand.

English	Cantonese	Faan	Description
Common Hand (i.e., all sequences)	平糊; ping4 wu4*2	1	Every meld is a Chow
Common Hand (i.e., all sequences)	🀞 🀟 🀠 🀙 🀚 🀛 🀈 🀉 🀊 🀖 🀗 🀘 🀌		
All in Triplets	對對糊; deoi3 deoi3 wu4*2	3	Every meld is either a Pong or Kong
All in Triplets	🀙 🀏 🀔 🀚 🀅		
Mixed One Suit	混一色; wan6 jat1 sik1	3	Only honor tiles and tiles from one suit
Mixed One Suit	🀙 🀚 🀛 🀜 🀝 🀞 🀟 🀀		
All One Suit	清一色; cing1 jat1 sik1	7	All tiles from one suit
All One Suit	🀙 🀚 🀛 🀜 🀝 🀞 🀟 🀠		
Mixed Orphans	花幺九; faa1 jiu1 gau2	1	Hand containing Pongs/Kongs of Ones, Nines, or Honor Tiles only (implies All in Triplets, which adds another 3 faan)
Mixed Orphans	🀇 🀀 🀘 🀄︎ 🀙		
Small Dragons	小三元; siu2 saam1 jyun4)	5	Melds of 2 dragons and a pair of the 3rd dragon. The faan of the 2 dragon triplets will be counted also, such that the dragon tiles will add 5 faan.
Small Dragons	🀄︎ 🀆 🀞 🀟 🀠 🀎 🀅		
Great Dragons	大三元; daai6 saam1 jyun4	8	Melds of all 3 dragons. The faan of the 3 dragon triplets will be counted also, such that the dragon tiles will add 8 faan.
Great Dragons	🀄︎ 🀅 🀆 🀔 🀕 🀖 🀙		
Small Winds (Note: For Small Winds, some variations have a further restriction with the prevailing wind or the seat wind disallowed as the pair.)	小四喜; siu2 sei3 hei2	6	Melds of 3 winds and a pair of the 4th wind. Bonuses for seat or round wind can result in even higher faan. If the remaining meld is from a suit, this hand will satisfy Mixed One Suit (which adds another 3 faan). Thus, a hand that satisfies Small Winds will grant at least 9 faan in practice.
Small Winds	🀀 🀁 🀂 🀍 🀎 🀏 🀃		
Seven Pairs (played by some variants)	七對子; cat1 deoi3 zi2	4	Hand consists of seven pairs. Can stack with All Honor Tiles, Mixed One Suit and All One Suit. In some variants, Kongs are not permitted in this hand.
Seven Pairs (played by some variants)	🀙 🀚 🀟 🀏 🀔 🀀 🀁		

==== Limit Hands ====
Certain high-scoring hands are "limit hands" that are ineligible for additional faan awarded based on winds, dragons, or flowers. Even if the limit hand satisfies other hand criteria (e.g., all honor tiles must also be all triplets), the faan from the other criteria are not counted.

Various sources classify limit hands differently and assign them different scores (e.g., the Hong Kong Mahjong Association sets a maximum faan of 10, such that 13 Orphans is only awarded 10 faan). This section is written to conform with the Cantonese version of this article.

If a winning hand satisfies more than one capped hand criterion (e.g., great winds where the pair are dragons, therefore also an all honor tile hand), only the criterion with the highest score applies.

All Honor Tiles	字一色; zi6 jat1 sik1	10	All honor tiles
All Honor Tiles	🀁 🀂 🀃 🀅 🀄︎		
Self Triplets	四暗刻; sei3 am3 hak1 坎坎糊; kaan2 kaan2 wu2	10	Every meld is either a concealed (unmelded) Pong or concealed Kong. (Note: In Hong Kong Mahjong, if a player draws all four tiles, they can declare a concealed Kong meld. All tiles face down. The meld cannot be undone. The player replenishes a tile from the end of wall.) The bonus can only be won either (a) by self-pick or (b) from a discarded winning tile that forms the pair, i.e., the discard cannot form the melds.
Orphans	么九; jiu1 gau2	10	Hand containing Pongs/Kongs of Ones and Nines only
Orphans	🀇 🀏 🀘 🀐 🀙		
Nine Gates (Note: It is called nine gates because there are 9 tiles that the player can win with. It is required that the hand be totally concealed (i.e. the only tile that can be taken from a discard is the extra tile in the set). This animation shows how any one tile in the same suit will create a winning hand: )	九子連環; gau2 zi2 lin4 waan4	10	Hand in any one suit consisting of 1112345678999, must be totally concealed.
Nine Gates	+ any tile in the set		
Great Winds	大四喜; daai6 sei3 hei2	13	Melds of all 4 winds
Great Winds	🀀 🀁 🀂 🀃 🀜		
All Kongs	十八羅漢; sap6 baat3 lo4 hon3 四槓子; sei3 gong3 zi2 槓槓和; gong3 gong3 wo4	13	Hand containing four Kongs (and a pair)
All Kongs	🀠 🀔 🀃 🀜 🀏		
Thirteen Orphans	十三么; sap6 saam1 jiu1	13	One of each one, nine, wind, and dragon, and a 14th tile (any other terminal or honor tile)
Thirteen Orphans	+ any tile in the set		

=== Wind and Dragon Faan ===
English	Cantonese	Faan	Description	Example
Seat Wind	門風 (mun4 fung1)	1	A meld of the winner's seat wind	/ / /
Prevailing Wind	圈風 (hyun1 fung1)	1	A meld of the prevailing wind	/ / /
Red Dragon	紅中 (hung4 zung1)	1	A meld of the red dragon	🀄︎
Green Dragon	發財 (faat3 coi4)	1	A meld of the green dragon	🀅
White Dragon	白板 (baak6 baan2)	1	A meld of the white dragon	🀆

A double wind, where a certain wind is both the winner's seat wind and the prevailing wind, counts as 2 faan.

=== Flower Faan ===
Some criteria for faan are based on "bonus tiles"—the flowers and the seasons (which are also collectively called flowers).

English	Cantonese	Faan	Description	Example
No Flowers or Seasons	无花 (mou4 faa1)	1	No flower or season bonus tiles	
Flower of Own Wind	正花 (zing3 faa1)	1	A flower of the winner's seat wind	/ / /
Season of Own Wind	正花 (zing3 faa1)	1	A season of the winner's seat wind	/ / /
All Flowers	一台花 (jat1 toi4 faa1)	2	All flower bonus tiles (does not stack with Flower of Own Wind)	
All Seasons	一台花 (jat1 toi4 faa1)	2	All season bonus tiles (does not stack with Season of Own Wind)	

Under certain custom rules, a player who draws 7 bonus tiles can declare a win worth 3 faan on the spot; a player who draws all 8 bonus tiles can declare a win worth 13 faan.

=== Winning Condition Faan ===
Other scoring criteria are based on the winning condition—how the winner won.

English	Cantonese	Additional Faan	Description
Self-Pick	自摸 (zi6 mo1)	1	The winning tile is from the wall
Win from Wall (i.e., fully concealed hand)	門前清 (mun4 cin4 cing1)	1	Awarded when the entire hand remains concealed (no open melds exposed) until the winning tile is either self-drawn or claimed from a discard. Hands that are strictly concealed by definition (e.g., Seven Pairs, Thirteen Orphans, Self Triplets, Nine Gates) do not receive this additional point.
Robbing Kong	搶槓 (coeng2 gong3)	1	When the tile used by player A to make a Kong is player B's winning tile, player B can declare a win (and obtain this bonus).
Win by Last Catch	海底撈月 (hoi2 dai2 lau4 jyut6)	1	The winning tile is either the last tile from the wall or the last discard
Win by Kong	槓上開花 (gong3 soeng5hoi1faa1)	1	The winning tile is from a replacement tile due to a Kong or a Bonus Tile. Implies self-pick (which adds 1 additional faan).
Win by Double-Kong	槓上槓 (gong3 soeng5gong3)	8	Similar to 'Win by Kong', except that the tile used to make the Kong was itself an extra tile from declaring a Kong. Implies self-pick (which adds 1 additional faan).
Heavenly Hand	天糊 (tin1 wu4*2)	13	East wins with initial hand
Earthly Hand	地糊 (dei6 wu4*2)	13	Non-East player wins on East's first discard

== Converting faan to score ==
Faan is converted score in an exponential manner (i.e., each additional faan is worth more than the last). When gambling with mahjong, these scores represent money, e.g., 8 points is 8 Hong Kong dollars.

=== Faan-to-score table ===
In typical Hong Kong mahjong (also known as Hong Kong New Style), there are two common ways to translate faan: "full spicy" and "half spicy". Players can also forgo both and agree on a custom table.

==== Full spicy ====
In "full spicy", the points awarded for a hand are 2 to the power of the number of faan, i.e., $2^{\text{faan}}$.

Faan	Points	Formula
0	1	$2^0 = 1$
1	2	$2^1 = 2$
2	4	$2^2 = 2 \times 2 = 4$
3	8	$2^3 = 2 \times 2 \times 2 = 8$
4	16	$2^4 = 16$
5	32	$2^5 = 32$
6	64	$2^6 = 64$
7	128	$2^7 = 128$
8	256	$2^8 = 256$
9	512	$2^9 = 512$
10	1024	$2^{10} = 1024$
11	2048	$2^{11} = 2048$
12	4096	$2^{12} = 4096$
13	8192	$2^{13} = 8192$

==== Half spicy ====
"Half spicy" mitigates how quickly points increase with each additional faan.

It starts the same as full spicy, but from 4 faan onward, points double every two faan instead of every one. An odd-numbered faan above 4—e.g., 5 faan—is always 1.5 times the points of the previous faan.

Faan	Points	Formula
0	1	$2^0 = 1$
1	2	$2^1 = 2$
2	4	$2^2 = 4$
3	8	$2^3 = 8$
4	16	$2^4 = 16$
5	24	$1.5 \times 2^4 = 24$
6	32	$2^5 = 32$
7	48	$1.5 \times 2^5 = 48$
8	64	$2^6 = 64$
9	96	$1.5 \times 2^6 = 96$
10	128	$2^7 = 128$
11	192	$1.5 \times 2^7 = 192$
12	256	$2^8 = 256$
13	384	$1.5 \times 2^8 = 384$

=== Which player pays ===
Suppose player A wins with 3 faan, their winning tile is from player B, and discarder pays all. Under either the full or half spicy table, that translates to 8 points.

When player A gains 8 points, because player B is the discarder, the latter loses 8 points.

	Player A	Player B	Player C	Player D
Before	0	0	0	0
Game 1	+8	−8	0	0

The total points in a mahjong game always sum to zero.

==== How to handle self-pick ====
When a player self-draws their winning tile, all players pay. The points awarded are 1.5 times the table amount, which also ensures the winner's total is divisible by three.

Building on the previous example, suppose player C wins with 3 faan and their winning tile is self-drawn. Under either the full or half spicy table, that translates to 8 points. The self-pick means player C is awarded $1.5 \times 8 = 12$ points instead.

	Player A	Player B	Player C	Player D
Before	+8	−8	0	0
Game 2	−4	−4	+12	−4
Total	+4	−12	+12	−4

=== Common modifications ===
==== Discarder-pays-all or -half ====
There are two ways to handle payment when the winning tile comes from a discard.

In discarder-pays-all, the discarder pays the winner the full points.

In discarder-pays-half, only half the awarded points are paid by the discarder; the other half is split evenly between and paid by the two remaining players.

==== Faan maximum ====
To reduce the stakes, a common modification is to cap the number of faan recognized. Typically the cap is set at 10 faan. That would mean, for example, that a 12-faan win is still awarded the points for 10 faan.

==== Divide by a constant ====
To reduce the stakes, players can also agree to divide all points by a constant, e.g., 16. This would make a 3-faan hand worth ${8 \div 16 = 0.5}$ point. This can also scale point values when settling in a currency that is more valuable than Hong Kong dollars.

For round numbers, the constant should be a multiple of 2.

=== Old-style scoring ===
There's also documentation of more archaic scoring systems, commonly referred to as Hong Kong Old Style. These can be viewed here.

== Penalties ==
English	Cantonese	Description
False win	詐糊	If a player declares a winning hand that doesn't meet the faan minimum, they pay all players the points for the maximum faan, i.e., the player loses $384 \times 3 = 1152$ points under the half spicy table.

=== Penalties that apply under discarder-pays-half system ===
English	Cantonese	Description
9 Pieces Penalty	九張包	Discarder pays all losses for enabling winner to go out with Pure Hand after winner had already melded 3 sets (9 tiles) of the same suit
12 Pieces Penalty	十二張包自摸	Winner goes out with Self-Picked Pure Hand after discarder has allowed them to meld a 4th set of the same suit; Discarder pays all losses
Fifth Tile Penalty	五子包生	Discarder pays all losses for discarding a "fresh" (previously unseen anywhere on the table) tile when there are 5 or less tiles left in the wall, allowing winner to go out

== Use of poker chips ==
Poker chips can be used to keep score. When used, all players must agree upon how many points one chip is worth.

There is no universally followed rule for what happens when a player runs out of points (i.e. their total points goes below zero). In some circles, the match is immediately aborted, with the player furthest ahead in score declared the winner, while in others, a player out of poker chips continues to play without risk of further losses. The loser can also pay cash to buy back the chips from the winners and the game continues.

== Hand progress terminology ==
The following is a list of terms describing the progress of one's hand:

- 獨聽 (duk6 teng1) - Known in English typically as a one-shot win or a last-chance win, this occurs if the winner was looking for one and only one tile to win the hand (e.g., the middle tile in a Chow). In some variations, this may extend to cases where two or more tiles could win the hand, but all but one were previously discarded.
- 雞糊 (gai1 wu2) - Also known in some circles as 推倒胡 (tuī dǎo hú/teoi1 dit3 wu4) or 雞胡 (ji hú/gai1 wu4 "Chicken Hand"), this is used to describe a winning hand worth zero faan, or no points. For games with a minimum faan score, this can also describe those with insufficient faan.
- 詐糊 (zaa3 wu2) - Known in English literally as a trick hand, used to describe a "false alarm" when a player claims to have won the amount claimed but in fact has not.
- 食糊 (sik6 wu2) - Winning off another player's discard.
- 叫糊 (giu3 wu2) - A "ready" or "waiting" hand, one tile away from winning.
