= World Mahjong Championship =

Tile-based game tournaament

The World Mahjong Championship is played to determine the World Champion in the table game Mahjong held by World Mahjong Organization (WMO). Both men and women are eligible to contest this title, and the championship holds both of Individual event and Team event.

== History ==
Since the propagation of Mahjong at the beginning of the 20th century, the rules of Mahjong have been inconsistent all around the world. In January 1998, Mahjong was certified as the 255th sport by General Administration of Sport of China at the urging of Japan. In September, unified Chinese rules were codified for international competitions. On October 23, 2002, the first world championship was held in Iidabashi, Tokyo, Japan over three days, but this event was not counted as the first world championship.

After the establishment of World Mahjong Organization(WMO) in 2006, the official first world championship was held in Chengdu, Sichuan, China on November 1, 2007 and lasted for five days. Li Li, a Chinese student of Tsinghua University, won the championship. In team event, China Shanxi Jiexiu won the championship with 94 table points.

On June 15, 2007, World Mahjong ltd.(WML), the company based on Hong Kong, promoted the World Series Of Mahjong (WSOM) in Macau. This event took the prize system of US$1,000,000 and the winner was given US$500,000. This event was a competition held by a private company and it was not certified by WMO.

The second official World Mahjong Championship (WMC) took place in Utrecht from August 27 to August 29, 2010. The new World Champion again comes from China: Ms. Linghua Jiao won the competition with 32 table points (acquired in 9 sessions). The follow-ups were both Europeans – the same held true for the country ranking, which was calculated as a team score of the best three national players from each country: China ranked first with 85 table points, followed by France (78 TP) and Denmark (77 TP).

== Champions ==
=== Individual ===
| No. | Dates | Venue | Gold | Silver | Bronze |
|---|---|---|---|---|---|
| — | October 23, 2002 | (Japan) Hotel Grand Palace, Iidabashi, Tokyo | (Japan) Mai Hatsune | (United States) John J. O'Connor | (Japan) Yūichi Ikeya |
| 1 | November 1–5, 2007 | (China) Hong Zhu Shan Hotel, Chengdu, Sichuan | (China) Li Li | (China) Zhangfei Zhang | (Japan) Minoru Imaeda |
| 2 | August 27–29, 2010 | (Netherlands) Nationaal Denksport Centrum 'Den Hommel', Utrecht | (China) Linghua Jiao | (France) Olivier Boivin | (Austria) Elisabeth Frischenschlager |
| 3 | October 25, 2012 | (China) Chongqing | (China) Yanbin Duan | (China) Zhangfei Zhang | (China) Changjian Li |
| 4 | November 11–15, 2015 | (South Korea) Haevichi Hotel & Resort, Jeju | (China) Zhou Yong | (China) Linghua Jiao | (France) Joël Ratsimandresy |
| 5 | October 26–28, 2017 | (China) Xi'an | (China) Baohua Sun | (France) Joël Ratsimandresy | (Canada) Jianzhong Jiang |
| 6 | November 1–3, 2019 | (France) Salle de l'Atelier, Villefranche-sur-Saône | (China) Zhou Yong | (France) Sandra Berthommier | (France) Frédéric Petit |
| 7 | October 11–14, 2024 | (Canada) Mississauga Convention Center, Mississauga | (Canada) Gao Erfei | (Germany) Dagmar Fischer | (Canada) Lin Hai |

=== Team ===
| No. | Year | Gold | Silver | Bronze |
|---|---|---|---|---|
| — | 2002 | (Japan) Young Pros Team B | (China) Guangzhou | Japan Health Mahjong Association Selected Team |
| 1 | 2007 | China Shanxi Jiexiu | China Shanghai Zhangjiang | Japan Mahjong Sport Association Osaka |
| 2 | 2010 | China (Top-3 players) | France (Top-3 players) | Denmark (Top-3 players) |
| 6 | 2019 | France (Top-3 players) | Russia (Top-3 players) | China (Top-3 players) |
| 7 | 2024 | Canada | Germany | France |

== Venues ==
| Date | Edition | Location | Venue |
|---|---|---|---|
| October 23, 2002 | 2002 World Championship in Mahjong | Iidabashi, Tokyo, Japan | Hotel Grand Palace |
| November 1, 2007 | 1st World Mahjong Championship 2007 | Chengdu, Sichuan, China | Hong Zhu Shan Hotel |
| August 27, 2010 | 2nd World Mahjong Championship 2010 | Utrecht, Netherlands | Nationaal Denksport Centrum 'Den Hommel' |
| October 25, 2012 | 3rd World Mahjong Championship 2012 | Chongqing, China | |
| November 11, 2015 | 4th World Mahjong Championship 2015 | Jeju, Korea | |
| November 25, 2017 | 5th World Mahjong Championship 2016 | Xi'an, China | |
| November 1, 2019 | 6th World Mahjong Championship 2019 | Villefranche-sur-Saône, France | |
| October 11, 2024 | 7th World Mahjong Championship 2024 | Mississauga, Canada | |

== See also ==
- List of world championships in mind sports
- Mahjong
- Open European Mahjong Championship
- World Mahjong Organization
- World Series Of Mahjong
