= World Mahjong Sports Games =

The World Mahjong Sports Games (WMSG, Chinese: 世界麻将运动会) is played to determine the World Champion in the table game Mahjong held by Mahjong International League (MIL). Both men and women are eligible to contest this title, and the championship holds both of Individual event and Team event.

== History ==
The event was held at Sheraton Sanya Yalong Bay Hotel in China.

There were 3 styles of events including a team competition, an individual competition and a Mahjong carnival. In a Mahjong carnival, there were several styles of competitions of Riichi and MCR rules.

== Champions ==
=== Individual ===
The names are ordered as Given name and Surname.

No.	Winner	2nd	3rd
1	Bo Tang (China)	Jian Zhao (China)	Liang Li (China)

=== Team ===
No.	Winner		2nd		3rd	
1	China B	Jian Zhao (China)	Hong Kong & Macau	?	China A	?
1	China B	Yong Zhou (China)	Hong Kong & Macau	?	China A	?
1	China B	Changsheng Zhou (China)	Hong Kong & Macau	?	China A	?
1	China B	Huatong Lu (China)	Hong Kong & Macau	?	China A	?

== Venues ==
Date	Edition	Place	Venue
October 24–28, 2015	1st World Mahjong Sports Games	Sanya, Hainan Island, Hainan Province, China	Sheraton Sanya Yalong Bay Hotel

== See also ==
- Mahjong
- Mahjong International League
- World Mahjong Organization
- World Mahjong Championship
