= Sexy baby voice =

English language speech pattern

"Sexy baby voice" is an English language speech pattern or sociolect, first described by U.S. media in 2013, in which young women affect the high-pitched voice of pre-pubescent girls. Actress Lake Bell popularized the term with her 2013 film In a World..., and subsequently gave various interviews on the speech pattern.

== Features ==
The speech patterns at issue are described as sounding "like Minnie Mouse on helium", or a "mousy squeak [with a] handful of gravel tossed across the very top of the register". Actress Lake Bell described the style as an amalgamation of "valley-girl voice" (characterized by "upspeak" and vocal fry) and high pitch.

== Controversy ==
"Sexy baby voice" is controversial in discussions about gender equality and related issues. Bell and others have argued that the use of "sexy baby voice" demeans the speaker, who appears as a "submissive 12-year-old trying to be a sex object", or that its use in film and television exploits contemporary culture's "fetish for adult sexuality wrapped in adolescent packages".

Others questioned the purpose of critiquing the speech pattern, asserting that "picking at the vocal quirks of your own gender is just as much of a nuisance as harping on the bodies that belong to them". Phonetician Mark Liberman wrote that it was not clear that the discussion about "sexy baby voice" referred to a specific speech pattern rather than just "a long list of things about various female-associated vocal features that people don't like". He also noted previous discussions about similar female speech patterns in earlier decades, such as a controversy about "uptalk" in the 1990s.

== See also ==
- Breathy voice
- Betty Boop
- "Happy Birthday, Mr. President"
- Vocal fry
- Burikko
- Kawaii
- Aegyo
- Moe (slang)
