= Japan Crate =

Japanese online subscription service

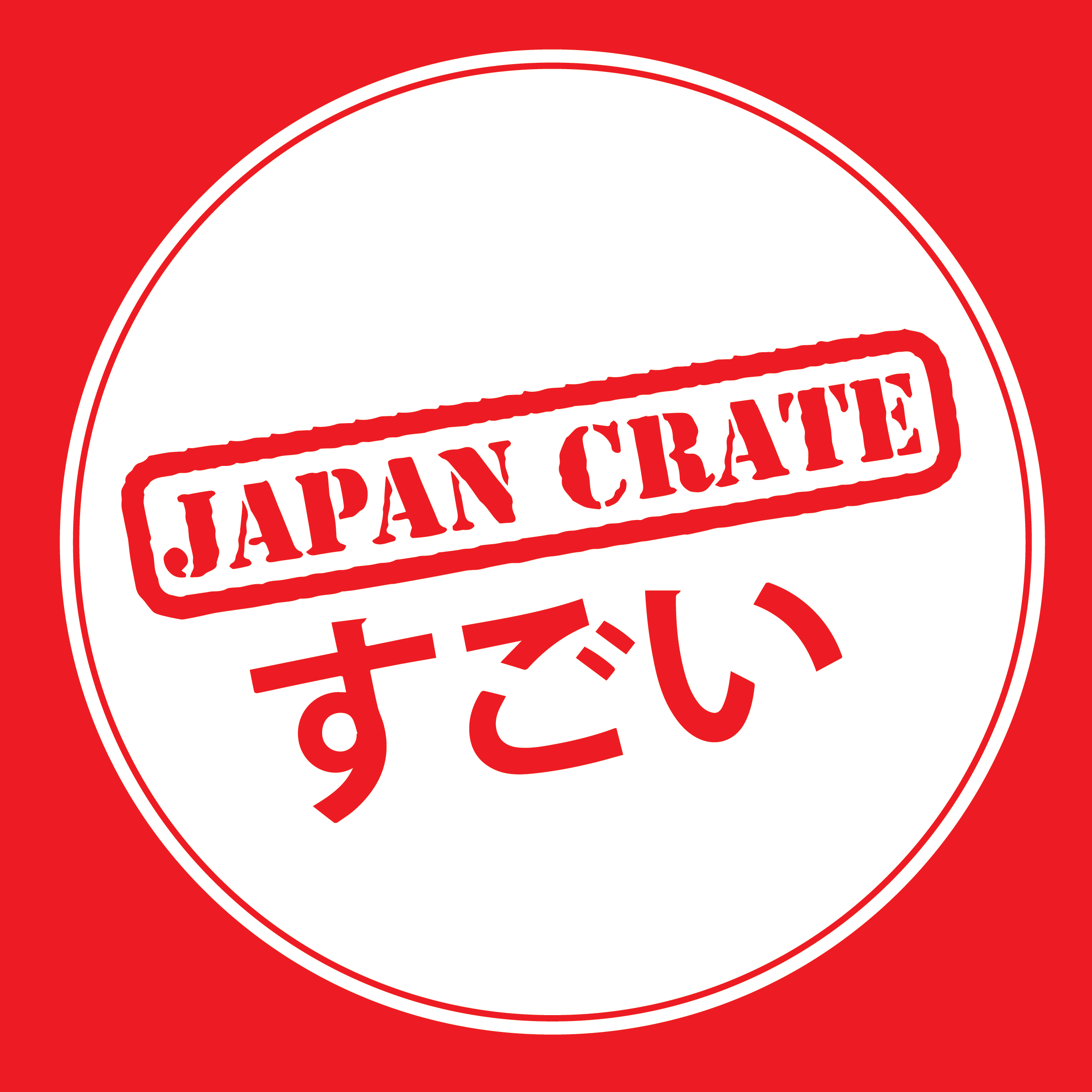
- Type: Private
- Industry: Consumer packaged goods
- Founded: September, 2014
- Founders: Hank Rao, Anthony Sconzo
- Headquarters: Tokyo, Japan
- Area served: Worldwide
- Products: Mini Crate, Original Crate, Premium Crate, Doki Doki Crate, Umai Crate, Kira Kira Crate, Inku Crate, Gacha Crate
- Website: www.japancrate.com

Japan Crate was a Tokyo-based online monthly subscription service that sends its subscribers a crate of Japanese candy, snacks and drinks on a monthly basis to share the experience of visiting Japan.

== History ==
In November 2015, Japan Crate added a second crate, Doki Doki Crate, to share Japan's kawaii culture. It includes licensed merchandise, plushes, figures, collectibles and more. In August 2016, Japan Crate launched their third crate, Umai Crate, sharing noodles. In November 2016 Japan Crate launched their fourth crate, Kira Kira Crate, with beauty products.

In February 2020, Japan Crate partnered with Bandai Namco Entertainment to bring Sword Art Online figurines to market in the US.

In June 2023 Japan Crate was wholly acquired by Bokksu for an undisclosed amount.
