= Cool Japan =

20th–21st century Japanese soft power strategy

Cool Japan (クールジャパン, Kūru Japan) refers to the aspects of Japanese culture that non-Japanese people perceive as "cool". After the success of "Cool Britannia," the Japanese government started using the phrase. The Cool Japan strategy is part of Japan's overall brand strategy, aiming to disseminate Japan's attractiveness and allure to the world. The target of Cool Japan "encompasses everything from video games, manga, anime, and other forms of content, fashion, commercial products, Japanese cuisine, and traditional culture to robots, eco-friendly technologies, and other high-tech industrial products".

Due to the combination of its failures in World War II and its aggressive imperial history, Japan was forced by circumstances, specifically the United States, to alter its approach to global diplomacy. Under Article 9, Japan was no longer able to employ hard power through its military. As a result, it cultivated and pioneered soft power as its approach to its position on the global stage. In this, Japan was forced to figure out how to go about in security, aid, and leadership, starting with reinventing their image and rebuilding their negative reputation. Japan's "Cool Japan" Initiative was a major cornerstone of its soft power policy and greatly contributed to their reintegration into regional and global leadership.

Cool Japan has been described as a form of soft power, with the ability to "indirectly influence behavior or interests through cultural or ideological means".

== Origins ==
Starting in 1980, following the emergence of the Japanese Ministry of Foreign Affairs (MOFA), Japan began to increase its nation branding efforts through the release of a television series titled Oshin, a Japanese soap opera. Oshin was distributed at no cost outside of Japan, and was well received in 46 countries. Through the success of Oshin and multiple other television shows, Japan successfully established the idea of "Cool Japan" as a method of establishing and improving the country's cultural perception.

In a 2002 article in Foreign Policy titled "Japan's Gross National Cool", Douglas McGray wrote of Japan "reinventing superpower" as its cultural influence expanded internationally, despite the economic and political problems of the Lost Decade. Surveying youth culture and the role of J-pop, manga, anime, video games, fashion, film, consumer electronics, architecture, cuisine, and phenomena of kawaii ("cuteness") such as Hello Kitty, McGray highlighted Japan's considerable cultural soft power, posing the question of what message the country might project. He also argued that Japan's recession may even have boosted its national cool, due to the partial discrediting of formerly rigid social hierarchies and big-business career paths.

== Adoption ==
Taken up in the international media, with The New York Times running a retrospect "Year in Ideas: Pokémon Hegemon", an increasing number of more reform-minded government officials and business leaders in Japan began to refer to the country's "gross national cool" and to adopt the unofficial slogan "Cool Japan". In a 2005 press conference, the Ministry of Foreign Affairs linked the idea to Bhutan's concept of Gross National Happiness.

The phrase gained greater exposure in the mid-2000s as NHK began a series entitled Cool Japan Hakkutsu: Kakkoii Nippon!, which by the end of 2009 had reached over 100 episodes. Academic initiatives include the establishment of a "Cool Japan" research project at the Massachusetts Institute of Technology, while some western universities have reported an increase in the number of applicants for Japanese Studies courses due to the "cool" effect.

The adoption of Cool Japan has also spurred changes in culture studies. As a result of the fascination of Cool Japan with Japanese youth culture and schoolgirls, a new wave of studies called 'girl studies' focuses specifically on the experience of girls and the girls-at-heart. Previously a subject of adolescent psychology or feminism, girl studies emerged from Cool Japan to include an interdisciplinary analysis of girl culture.

== Creative Industries Promotion Office ==
The Japanese government has identified the culture industry as one of five potential areas of growth. In June 2010, the Ministry of Economy, Trade and Industry established a new Creative Industries Promotion Office to promote cultural and creative industries as a strategic sector "under the single, long term concept of "Cool Japan", to coordinate different government functions, and to cooperate with the private sector". The Ministry of Economy, Trade and Industry announced that Japanese pop culture is one of the key elements for Cool Japan and that pop culture includes idol, anime, and B class gourmet (B級グルメ).

The deputy director described its mission as to "brand Japanese products with the uniqueness of Japanese culture", with a budget of ¥19 billion for 2011 alone. In the fiscal year 2008, public spending on cultural activities was ¥116.9 billion in South Korea, ¥477.5 billion in China, and ¥101.8 billion in Japan, forming 0.79%, 0.51%, and 0.12% of total government spending respectively. The fund was launched in 2013, and the Japanese government committed to the Cool Japan Fund ¥50 billion ($500 million) over 20 years, with a target of ¥60 billion ($600 million) via private investor partnerships. However, Nikkei Asian Review reported that within five years the fund "suffered pretax losses totaling 10 billion yen ($88.9 million)", and that many projects failed to deliver earnings. Since June 2018, the management has been led by former Sony Music Entertainment (Japan) CEO Naoki Kitagawa.

== Timeline of notable endeavors ==
2013
Establishment of Cool Japan Fund Inc. under the Law of Cool Japan Fund Inc. (Act No.51 of 2013).
2014
Traditional Japanese crafts showcased at Maison & Objet, the world's largest trade fair for interior goods and designs, to promote Japan's monodzukuri (manufacturing) culture.
WakuWaku Japan, Japanese satellite television channel that broadcasts Japanese programs to overseas viewers in Asia. It was a joint venture with broadcaster Sky Perfect JSAT who contributed ¥6.6 billion out of ¥11 billion, but failed to expand in multiple markets and generate viewership, with nearly ¥4 billion losses until 2017.
2015
METI starts Nippon Quest, a website to showcase and disseminate unknown Japanese regional specialties to the world.
US cafes focused on Japanese tea, on which was spent ¥250 million for nearly 50% stake.
Funding of the development of content creators for anime and manga outside Japan by KADOKAWA Contents Academy Co., Ltd.
2016
Isetan the Japan Store, a joint venture with Isetan to make a five-floor department store in Kuala Lumpur, Malaysia, to promote Japanese goods and services. However, lack of demand resulted with a loss of circa $4.5 million, and all Cool Japan Fund shares sold to Isetan Mitsukoshi Holdings.
2018
The first investment with new management was $12.5 million in Tastemade, becoming a minority shareholder, to support making of content promoting Japanese food and destinations.
2019
Cool Japan Fund invests US$30 million in American anime licensing company Sentai Holdings, aiming to provide support at the copyright level, and increasing the presence of anime in North America. On September 30, 2020, the Cool Japan Fund made an additional US$3.6 million available, stating that Sentai had achieved better financial results in 2019 compared to 2018, with plans for medium and long-term growth, and strategic changes following the COVID-19 pandemic.

== Criticism ==
Japan's use of soft power through its "Cool Japan" strategy has faced criticism connected to its imperialist history. Under its imperial rule over South Korea, Japan cultivated an extremely negative perception of itself due to its treatment of Koreans. Thus, when Japan began implementing "Cool Japan" policies as a form of soft power in its post-WW2 era as a non-militaristic country, they were met with hesitation from many countries in the region, but most significantly, South Korea.

While "Cool Japan" efforts have now improved their image in South Korea and the region as a whole, it took a while for South Korea to trust Japan's intentions, and still faces hesitancy. Many South Koreans viewed this initiative as another way that Japan was inserting itself too much into different realms and cultures they did not belong to. Additionally, by attempting to spread their culture as a form of soft power, it was seen by others as Japan trying to put themselves into other countries in a way similar to when they had done so during its imperial era. It appeared to be reminiscent of the Co-Prosperity Sphere, in which Japan attempted, and ultimately failed, to implement too much of itself into others under imperial rule.

However, while this historical legacy of colonization had impeded Japan's efforts to implement "Cool Japan" initiatives in the region, the past two decades have indicated that it is improving their image and relationships. For instance, by coming together to create media and distribute it to each other's countries, Japan has been able to integrate a positive image in South Korea. This was evident when the two countries co-hosted the 2002 World Cup, showing that the two countries were willing to come together for a significant cultural moment, thus creating a positive image for the public.

Another issue which challenged the effectiveness of "Cool Japan" was the lack of relatability throughout Asia. This is also due to the combination of Japan's imperial history and the resulting closed approach of other countries to the Japanese media. In Japan's attempts to spread culture through television and movies, they faced difficulties because other countries were not receptive to it and did not feel a connection to the characters. This is rooted in the rejection of Japanese culture and their attempts to separate themselves as different from its neighbors. Japan was forced to shift their approach to media and improve the relatability of how they present characters. However, Japan was successful in this and as a result saw a spread of Japanese media and culture to their neighboring countries.

A 2010 editorial in the Yomiuri Shimbun argued that the government was not doing enough to advance the country's business interests in this sphere, allowing the Korean Wave to overshadow Japan's efforts. The editorial highlighted structural inefficiencies, with the Ministry of Economy, Trade and Industry promoting "Cool Japan", the Ministry of Foreign Affairs responsible for cultural exchange, and the Ministry of Agriculture, Forestry and Fisheries in charge of Japanese foods. Lecturer Roland Kelts has also suggested that a failure to fully distinguish, brand and engage the overseas audience and market may mean that "Cool Japan" is "over". In 2011, Laura Miller critiqued Cool Japan campaign as exploiting and misrepresenting youth subcultural fashion and language. In 2013, Nancy Snow referred to Cool Japan as a form of state-sponsored cultural retreading she calls Gross National Propaganda. Japanese singer-songwriter Gackt criticized the government in 2015 for having set up a huge budget, yet "have no idea where that money should go. It's no exaggeration to say it has fallen into a downward spiral of wasted tax money flowing into little known companies", and that such lack of support is causing Japan to "fall behind its Asian neighbors in terms of cultural exports". In 2016, Benjamin Boas pointed out that Cool Japan-branded efforts are often promoted without participation of foreigners, leaving out the perspectives of the very foreigners that they are trying to target.

In 2017, a senior executive and several other senior male employees of Cool Japan Fund Inc. were accused of sexual harassment targeting female employees of the fund. The employees formed a labor union in order to fight against sexual harassment. In the same year, Nikkei Asian Review journalist Yuta Saito criticized fund's ambitions because their "lack of strategy, discipline gives rise to unprofitable projects", and there's possible conflict of interest by the executives. In 2018, Japan Today reported that it was too soon to consider it "grossly incompetent or corrupt", but was at least "under-performing" for now.

On August 2026, government funding of the Cool Japan Fund was paused due to heavy losses totalling to ¥54,000,000,000 ($340 million).

== See also ==
- Becoming Chinese
- Cool Biz campaign
- Cool Britannia
- Cultural policy
- Japan Expo
- Japanese economic miracle
- Korean Wave
- K-pop
- Taiwanese Wave
