= Open European Mahjong Championship =

The Open European Mahjong Championship (OEMC) is the oldest European competition of Mahjong organized by European Mahjong Association (EMA) under Mahjong Competition Rules (MCR). Both men and women are eligible to contest this title, and the championship holds both the individual event and team event. It was established in 2005 and has since then taken place on two-yearly basis. As this championship is an open competition, any non-European players may participate.

== History ==
After a few months later of the first world championship was held in Tokyo, 2002, Martin Rep, a Dutch Mahjong Player, decided to establish European organizations for Mahjong.

On June 25, 2005, he promoted the first European Championship and also hold the General Assembly in Netherlands in Nijmegen, Netherlands. During this Assembly, EMA was established. Masato Chiba, from Japan, won the first championship.

On June 21, 2007, the 2nd European championship was held in Copenhagen, Denmark for 3 days. Martin Wedel Jacobsen from Denmark won the championship. Team event was begun since this championship. In 2008, EMA began another European Mahjong Championship under Japanese Riichi rule.

On July 11, 2011, Ildikó Hargitai became the first female mahjong player who won the European championship, and "French Team no1" from France won the team division.

== Champions ==
=== Individual ===
| No. | Winner | 2nd | 3rd |
|---|---|---|---|
| 1 | Masato Chiba (Japan) | Mai Hatsune (Japan) | Yoshinori Katō (Japan) |
| 2 | Martin Wedel Jacobsen ( (Denmark) ) | Kōichi Oda (Japan) | Benjamin Boas (USA) |
| 3 | Kōji Idota (Japan) | Bo Lang (Swiss) | Luca Gavelli (Italy) |
| 4 | Ildikó Hargitai (Hungary) | Martin Faartoft (Denmark) | Leni Janssen (Netherlands) |
| 5 | Yoshihiro Suzuki (Japan) | Michael Zahradnik (Germany) | Kazutoshi Miyake (Japan) |
| 6 | Yoshihiro Suzuki (Japan) | Linghua Jiao (China) | Matthieu Pfeiffer (France) |

=== Team ===
| No. | Winner | | 2nd | | 3rd | |
|---|---|---|---|---|---|---|
| 2 | Team Tokyo | Masato Chiba (Japan) | Norse Winds | Martin Wedel Jacobsen (Denmark) | France Bleu | Jérôme Bonifas (France) |
| 2 | Team Tokyo | Sugako Suzuki (Japan) | Norse Winds | Freddy Christiansen (Denmark) | France Bleu | Olivier Boivin (France) |
| 2 | Team Tokyo | Yuri Tezuka (Japan) | Norse Winds | Brian Krog (Denmark) | France Bleu | Vivian Hetmaniuk (France) |
| 2 | Team Tokyo | Yukari Kugimiya (Japan) | Norse Winds | Jeppe Stig Nielsen (Denmark) | France Bleu | Emma Guenel (France) |
| 3 | Japan JMSA Kyoto | Kōji Idota (Japan) | China 2 | Jianming Fan (China) | United Nations | Bo Lang (Switzerland) |
| 3 | Japan JMSA Kyoto | Shigeru Aono (Japan) | China 2 | Jianguo Liang (China) | United Nations | Hans Wikström (Sweden) |
| 3 | Japan JMSA Kyoto | Kimito Kugimiya (Japan) | China 2 | Jun Gao (China) | United Nations | Chris Redmond (United Kingdom) |
| 3 | Japan JMSA Kyoto | Kōichi Oda (Japan) | China 2 | Hongwu Zhou (China) | United Nations | Mei Hwa Felder (Switzerland) |
| 4 | French Team no1 | Antony Ea (France) | Nine Gates | Eveline Broers (Netherlands) | Upper 4 | Shi Hua Chen Kold (Denmark) |
| 4 | French Team no1 | Christian Enault (France) | Nine Gates | Leni Janssen (Netherlands) | Upper 4 | Tina Christensen (Denmark) |
| 4 | French Team no1 | Sebastien Roux (France) | Nine Gates | Chris Janssen (Netherlands) | Upper 4 | Martin Faartoft (Denmark) |
| 4 | French Team no1 | Brigitte Sandarom (France) | Nine Gates | Claudio Porrati (Italy) | Upper 4 | Jesper Willemoes Hansen (Denmark) |
| 5 | JMF | Kazutoshi Miyake (Japan) | Knitted Team | Chris Redmond (United Kingdom) | Team Sendai | Yoshihiro Suzuki (Japan) |
| 5 | JMF | Florine Leroy (France) | Knitted Team | Luc Humbert (Switzerland) | Team Sendai | Katsuyuki Onodera (Japan) |
| 5 | JMF | Yaichirō Ōwaki (Japan) | Knitted Team | Gérard Hêche (Switzerland) | Team Sendai | Yasuhiro Chiba (Japan) |
| 5 | JMF | Kenzō Tamakoshi (Japan) | Knitted Team | Mei Hwa Felder (Switzerland) | Team Sendai | Sugako Suzuki (Japan) |

== Venues ==
| Date | Edition | Place | Venue |
|---|---|---|---|
| June 24–26, 2005 | 1st Open European Mahjong Championship | Nijmegen, Netherlands | ING-zaal, Concertgebouw de Vereeniging |
| June 21–24, 2007 | 2nd Open European Mahjong Championship | Copenhagen, Denmark | Idrætsfabrikken |
| July 1–5, 2009 | 3rd Open European Mahjong Championship | Baden, Austria | Hotel Schloss Weikersdorf |
| July 6–11, 2011 | 4th Open European Mahjong Championship | Venice, Italy | NH Laguna Palace Mestre-Venice |
| July 3–6, 2014 | 5th Open European Mahjong Championship | Strasbourg, France | Pavillon Joséphine, Parc de l'Orangerie |
| May 25–29, 2017 | 6th Open European Mahjong Championship | Póvoa de Varzim, Portugal | Casino da Póvoa de Varzim |

== See also ==
- World Mahjong Championship(World competition under same rules)
- European Mahjong Association(EMA)
- European Riichi Championship (Another European Championship held by EMA)
