= Burikko =

Japanese term for girls or women who act deliberately cute or innocent

Burikko (ぶりっ子; sometimes rendered Burriko in English) is a Japanese term for girls or women who act coy, or deliberately cute and/or innocent in a put-on way. The term was coined around 1980, likely by Japanese comedian Kuniko Yamada. Burikko style is often associated with Japanese idols of the 1980s such as Seiko Matsuda. It is associated with the Japanese notion of kawaii, meaning "cute", which has become important in modern Japanese culture. Burikko is not so much a style or state of being, but a set of tools employed to mask the self, particularly women's sexuality. This is emphasized in the common phrase burikko suru "to do burikko".

== Characteristics ==
Burikko are girls or women who act coy, or deliberately cute and/or innocent in a put on way. It includes the "idea of a helpless, submissive, and cute look of a young girl". The burikko subculture is an example of adults embracing child-like behavior and speech as a form of cuteness, also seen in South Korean aegyo or Chinese sājiāo among others.

Behaviors associated with burikko include "kitten writing", a rounded form of handwriting characters, as well as forms of baby talk "to sound like children learning to speak". As part of this childish way of speaking, people may refer to themselves by name as though they are talking about a third person (illeism). Burikko may also include a nasalized pronunciation, high pitch, amusing or light phrases, and mannerisms such as covering the mouth when smiling. Vocabulary will also convey burikko, by using melodic, sing-song vocabulary or onomatopoeia. Examples include otete instead of te for hand, katchoi instead of kakkoii for "cool," and wanwan "woof woof" for dog. Burikko may also use person suffixes added to nouns, such as takuchan "Mr. Little Taxi" instead of takushii for taxi.

== Criticism ==
Burikko is often elicited otoko no mae "in front of men" as a means of conveying weakness and deference.

Burikko becomes problematic in circles where the term has come to replace "young woman," reflecting upon young women a negative, phony connotation. Although men may complain about burikko, labeling its doers as fake, men may still appreciate and encourage the social connotation which it provides, positioning women beneath men in terms of strength and power. The paradox creates a "damned if she does, damned if she doesn't" dilemma for young women both desiring to appear genuine and desiring to advance in male-dominated society.

== See also ==
- Gender differences in Japanese
- Lolicon – Genre of sexualized young or young-looking female characters
- Moe – Affection for manga and anime characters
- Sexy baby voice
- Manga Burikko, a Japanese magazine based on the aesthetic
- The dictionary definition of burikko at Wiktionary
- The dictionary definition of coy at Wiktionary
