= Benjamin Boas =

American author, translator and contemporary Japanese culture consultant

Benjamin Boas (born 1983) is an American author, translator, and contemporary Japanese culture consultant. He has been appointed as a Cool Japan Ambassador by the Japanese government and as a Tourism Ambassador for Nakano, Tokyo.

== Biography ==
Born in New York, he grew up with a fondness for Japanese games and comic books, which motivated him to study the Japanese language and culture. After graduating from Brown University, he studied at Kyoto University on a Fulbright scholarship from 2007. He has also held research positions at the University of Tokyo as a Monbukagakusho scholar, at the Osaka University of Commerce, and at the anthropology department at Keio University Shonan Fujisawa Campus.

In 2015, he published his experiences of learning Japanese culture and language into a manga from Shogakukan. The same year, he was appointed as a Tourism Ambassador by the Nakano Tourism Association, to spread word about Nakano City.

In 2016, after Studio Ghibli commissioned him to write a critical essay on the Japanese government's self-promotion activities, he was appointed as a Cool Japan Ambassador by the Japanese Cabinet Office as part of their Cool Japan initiative. In this role, he regularly appears in programs on Japan's public broadcaster NHK, such as Tokyo Eye 2020 and Journeys in Japan. While spreading the appeal of contemporary Japan through these activities, he also writes critically about how the country could improve its efforts, and has been quoted in news articles for his views of the Cool Japan strategy. He is a frequent speaker at universities and institutions in Japan and the United States.

Boas holds a 2nd-degree black belt and instructor certification for aikido from Yoshinkan. He also represents the United States in international competitions of mahjong and took third place in the 2007 Open European Mahjong Championship and second place in the 2008 European Riichi Championship.

== Bibliography ==
=== Books ===
- Boas, Benjamin; Aoyagi, Chika (2015). 日本のことは、マンガとゲームで学びました。 [Learning Japan Through Manga and Video Games]. Shogakukan. ISBN 978-4-09-388395-5.
- Boas, Benjamin; Aoyagi, Chika (2016). 大人のためのやり直し英会話 [Re-Learning English for Adults]. Shogakukan. ISBN 978-4-09-388461-7.

=== Articles ===
- Boas, Benjamin (2010). "麻雀と法律の逆説的な関係--麻雀の健全化を阻害要因としての風適法とその取り締まり". Ōsaka Shōgyō Daigaku Amyūzumento Sangyō Kenkyūjo Kiyō (in Japanese). 12 (12). The Institute of Amusement Industry Studies, Osaka University of Commerce: 321–324. ISSN 1881-1949.
- Boas, Benjamin (2015). "'クールジャパン'はクールじゃない!?". Neppū. 'Cool Japan' is not cool!? (in Japanese). Vol. 13, no. 10. Koganei: Studio Ghibli. pp. 12–23.
- Boas, Benjamin (24 April 2016). "'Cool Japan' needs to listen to its target market". The Japan Times.

=== Documentaries ===
- Journeys in Japan (NHK WORLD)
  - "Yanai: Old Town of Goldfish Lanterns"
- TOKYO EYE 2020 (NHK WORLD)
  - Jul. 2017 "Countdown to 2020: Enhancing Tourism with Technology"
  - Sep. 2017 "Nakano: A Subculture Paradise"
  - Jun. 2018 "A Martial Arts Tour of Tokyo"
  - Jan. 2019 "Exploring Tokyo Underground"

=== Translations ===
- Battleship Island Building No. 30, Between Dreams and Reality by Takahashi Masatsugu. Daiwa Shobo
- Dance Time (2016), directed by Mariko Nonaka
