= European Mahjong Association =

- Abbreviation: EMA
- Formation: June 25, 2005
- Type: NPO
- Legal status: Association
- Purpose: to encourage, disseminate and coordinate the playing of mahjong in Europe
- Headquarters: Denmark
- Region served: Europe
- Members: 22 national organisations
- Official language: English
- President: (Denmark) Tina Christensen
- Affiliations: World Mahjong Organization
- Website: http://mahjong-europe.org/

The European Mahjong Association (EMA) is an international organisation for the interests of Mahjong in Europe. The main purposes are to certify competitions held by national organisations and to hold European championships.

== History ==
The European Mahjong Association (EMA) was established at the general assembly during the first European Championship in the Netherlands in June 2005. After this competition, EMA started holding European championships under international rules every 2 years, and started sanctioning Mahjong competitions which was held under international and Japanese rules.

On June 21, 2008, EMA held the first European Riichi Championship 2008 in Hannover, Germany. Since this year, EMA started European championships under Japanese rules every 2 years. For this reason, EMA holds different types of European competitions alternately.

== EMA instructed championships ==
- Open European Mahjong Championship (under International mahjong rule)
- European Riichi Championship (under Japanese riichi mahjong rule)

== See also ==
- World Mahjong Organization
