= Bokksu =

Japanese snack subscription and e-commerce company

- Company type: Private
- Industry: E-commerce
- Founded: 2015
- Founder: Danny Taing
- Products: Japanese snack subscription boxes, online grocery and marketplace services

Bokksu is an e-commerce company that sells Japanese snack subscription boxes and operates related online retail services for Japanese and Asian food products. The company was founded by Danny Taing in 2015 and began selling monthly subscription boxes centered on Japanese snacks in 2016.

== History ==
Taing founded Bokksu after living in Japan and returning to New York, where he saw an opportunity to sell Japanese snacks that were less commonly available in American stores. Fast Company reported that Bokksu launched its subscription service in 2016 with boxes containing snacks from different regions of Japan and printed material describing the snacks and their makers.

Bokksu expanded beyond subscription boxes with Bokksu Market in 2018 and Bokksu Grocery in 2021. In January 2022, TechCrunch reported that Bokksu had raised $22 million in Series A funding at a $100 million valuation, led by Valor Siren Ventures with participation from Company Ventures, St. Cousair, World Innovation Lab, Headline Asia and Gaingels.

In September 2023, Modern Retail reported that Bokksu had acquired Japan Crate, a competing Japanese snack subscription company. Terms of the transaction were not disclosed. Modern Retail reported that Japan Crate sold through more than 5,000 retail locations in addition to its own website, and that Bokksu planned to keep Bokksu and Japan Crate operating as separate brands.

== Products and services ==
Bokksu's original product was a monthly subscription box containing Japanese snacks, candies and tea pairings. Bon Appétit described the boxes as monthly shipments organized around changing themes, with written material about the family businesses and snack makers behind the items. Food & Wine reported in 2022 that Bokksu shipped more than 40,000 boxes per month to customers in 100 countries.

Bokksu Market was described by Food & Wine as an e-commerce marketplace for Japanese snacks and home decor. TechCrunch reported that Bokksu Grocery, opened in 2021, was an online grocery service for Asian food products.

== Kit Kat shipment incident ==
In November 2023, The New York Times reported on a shipment of 55,000 Japanese Kit Kats that Bokksu had imported for resale in the United States. The shipment had cost Bokksu $110,000, and the company expected about $250,000 in revenue from the products. According to the article, the shipment became tied up in what logistics experts described as a form of supply-chain fraud known as a fictitious pickup or strategic theft. Bokksu later filed a report with the Los Angeles County Sheriff's Department for insurance purposes, and the company's insurance claim was denied.
