= World Series Of Mahjong =

The World Series Of Mahjong (Chinese: 世界麻将大赛) was a privately sponsored Mahjong tournament. Both men and women were eligible to contest this title, and the top finishers received prize money with the champion also receiving a necklace. The tournament system competition took place over a few days. Contestants had to pay an entry fee and provide proof that they were at least the age of 21.

== History ==
The World Series Of Mahjong (WSOM) was established by World Mahjong Ltd.(WML) in 2007. Chunglai Hui, a designer from Hong Kong, won the first tournament. Following tournaments were held in 2008, 2010, and 2015.

== Rule set ==
The rules for the tournament were developed by Alan Kwan as a slight modification of his Zung Jung (中庸) pattern-based scoring system. The tournament used sets of 136 tiles, excluding the bonus flower tiles, and pairs of dice. Prevailing wind was not recognized.

== Champions ==
The names are ordered as Given name and Surname.

Tournament	Winner	2nd place	3rd place	4th place
1	Chunglai Hui (Hong Kong)	Laifun Lau (Hong Kong)	Chiehling Yu (Taiwan)	Chichung Tse (Hong Kong)
2	Kwokhung Ho(Alex Ho) (Hong Kong)	Kamwing Tong (Hong Kong)	Honam Lam (Hong Kong)	Shigeru Aono (Japan)
3	Takkwan Chan (Hong Kong)	Jinlong Pao (Hong Kong)	Xunzhi Yang (Taiwan)	Jindai Li (China)
4	Jian Zhao (China)	Taro Suzuki (Japan)	Siukui Lai (Hong Kong)	Chenglung Peng (Taiwan)

== Venues ==
Date	Competition	Place	Venue
June 15–18, 2007	2007 World Series Of Mahjong	Rua Cidade de Sintra, Nape, Macau	Wynn Macau
September 18–21, 2008	2008 World Series Of Mahjong	Rua Cidade de Sintra, Nape, Macau	Wynn Macau
August 19–22, 2010	2010 World Series Of Mahjong	Cotai Strip, Cotai, Macau	Venetian Macao-Resort-Hotel
December 5-6, 2015	2015 World Series of Mahjong	Cotai Strip, Cotai, Macau	Venetian Macao-Resort-Hotel

== See also ==
- Mahjong
- World Mahjong Organization
- World Mahjong Championship
