= 2002 World Championship in Mahjong =

The 2002 World Championship in Mahjong was held at the Hotel Grand Place in Tokyo, Japan, from 23 to 27 October in 2002. The title for this competition was "The Festival for Culture and Sport in Mah Jong".

The competition ran in cooperation between the Ningbo City Mahjong Sport Association and the Japan Mahjong Organizing Committee (JMOC). JMOC was formed with four Japanese organizations including the Japan Mahjong Federation, the All-Japan Mahjong Society, the Japan Health Mahjong Association, and the Mahjong Museum.

== Competition ==
This championship is not certified as the official first worldwide championship in mahjong because it had been held before the World Mahjong Organization was formed in 2006.

Although it was offered to China at first and was going to be held in Ningbo, which is known as the origin of mahjong, the location was moved to Japan because a large event was going to be held there.

For this reason, the competition was held at the Hotel Grand Palace in Iidabashi, Tokyo. 100 competitors with 25 teams from 8 nations, Bulgaria, China, Japan, Netherlands, Russia, Sweden, Taiwan, and the US, took part in this competition. JMOC held primarily tournaments in Tokyo and Osaka.

== Results ==
The names are ordered as given name and surname.

=== Individual ===
Best individual players
Rank	Name	Nationality	Table points	Mini points
1	Mai Hatsune	Japan	26	898
2	John J. O'Connor	United States	26	759
3	Yūichi Ikeya	Japan	24	892
4	Aki Nikaidō	Japan	23	893
5	Jin Li	China	23	443
6	Tomohiro Yoshida	Japan	22	691
7	Quanze Wu	China	22	622
8	Caofang Huang	China	22	583
9	Masashi Saitō	Japan	21	232
10	Junhao Cui	China	20	970

=== Team ===
Best team results
Rank	Name	Nationality	Members	Rank	Table points	Mini points	Total table points	Total mini points
1	Young Pros Team B	Japan	Kazutoshi Iwasawa	11	20	787	80	2253
1	Young Pros Team B	Japan	Ryōichi Kajita	16	20	446	80	2253
1	Young Pros Team B	Japan	Kenji Katsumata	24	18	329	80	2253
1	Young Pros Team B	Japan	Tomohiro Yoshida	6	22	691	80	2253
2	Guangzhou	China	Jin Li	5	23	443	76	1113
2	Guangzhou	China	Man Feng	25	18	226	76	1113
2	Guangzhou	China	Gangliang Yu	57	13	-139	76	1113
2	Guangzhou	China	Caofang Huang	8	22	583	76	1113
3	Japan Health Mahjong Association	Japan	Jun Kashiwabara	34	16	43	73	1165
3	Japan Health Mahjong Association	Japan	Noriko Maruyama	33	16	268	73	1165
3	Japan Health Mahjong Association	Japan	Masashi Saitō	9	21	232	73	1165
3	Japan Health Mahjong Association	Japan	Ryō Togamae	14	20	622	73	1165
4	Tianjin	China	Junhao Cui	10	20	970	69	1432
4	Tianjin	China	Baomin Yang	28	17	492	69	1432
4	Tianjin	China	Jianguo Li	39	15	-182	69	1432
4	Tianjin	China	Jing He	31	17	152	69	1432
5	Young Pros Team A	Japan	Takunori Kajimoto	12	20	655	69	1175
5	Young Pros Team A	Japan	Nobuhiro Kishimoto	56	13	-60	69	1175
5	Young Pros Team A	Japan	Dai Osamura	30	17	195	69	1175
5	Young Pros Team A	Japan	Tatsuya Suzuki	22	19	385	69	1175

== Participating countries ==
100 competitors with 25 teams from 8 countries participated. Although Shinnicni Tokuda did not register for this competition and he was Japanese, he played as Kenneth Tokuda for the US team because a vacancy occurred.

- Bulgaria (1)
- China (35)
- Japan (41)
- Netherlands (3)
- Russia (2)
- Sweden (2)
- Chinese Taipei (4)
- United States (12)
