= 1st World Mahjong Championship 2007 =

2007 World Mahjong championship located in China

The 1st World Mahjong Championship 2007 was held at the Hong Zhu Shan Hotel in Chengdu, Sichuan, China from November 1 to 5, in 2007. The official name of this event was "2007 The First Mahjong Cultural Exchange Congress and World Mahjong Championship". During the event, the Congress was held.

== Competition ==
This competition is the official first world championship in Mahjong after World Mahjong Organization was founded in 2006.

== Results ==
The names are ordered as Given name and Surname.

=== Individual ===
Rank	Name	Nationality	Table Points	Mini Points
1	Li Li	China	32	1411
2	Zhangfei Zhang	China	30	1143
3	Minoru Imaeda	Japan	30	752
4	Haiting Ni	China	28.5	1190
5	Bingcheng Zhang	China	28	1247
6	Linghua Jiao	China	28	1134
7	Kazutoshi Iwasawa	Japan	27	1127
8	Jun Gao	China	26	1118
9	Shufu Huang	China	25	708
10	Desiree Heemskerk	Netherlands	25	578

=== Team ===
Rank	Name	Nationality	Members	Rank	Table Points	Mini Points	Total Table Points	Total Mini Points
1	China Shanxi Jiexiu	China	Shufu Huang	10	25	708	100	3206
1	China Shanxi Jiexiu	China	Bingcheng Zhang	5	28	1247	100	3206
1	China Shanxi Jiexiu	China	Linghua Jiao	6	28	1134	100	3206
1	China Shanxi Jiexiu	China	Quanze Gao	12	19	117	100	3206
2	China Shanghai Zhangjiang	China	Wenlong Li	98	11	75	88	2665
2	China Shanghai Zhangjiang	China	Bo Zhang	16	21	329	88	2665
2	China Shanghai Zhangjiang	China	Jun Gao	8	26	1118	88	2665
2	China Shanghai Zhangjiang	China	Zhangfei Zhang	2	30	1143	88	2665
3	Japan Mahjong Sport Association Osaka	Japan	Kazutoshi Iwasawa	7	27	1127	82	1763
3	Japan Mahjong Sport Association Osaka	Japan	Kohichi Oda	35	18	330	82	1763
3	Japan Mahjong Sport Association Osaka	Japan	Kimito Kugimiya	36	18	249	82	1763
3	Japan Mahjong Sport Association Osaka	Japan	Kōji Idota	32	19	57	82	1763
4	Japan Mahjong Sport Association Tokyo	Japan	Sugako Suzuki	33	18	531	80	2264
4	Japan Mahjong Sport Association Tokyo	Japan	Masato Chiba	15	22	1039	80	2264
4	Japan Mahjong Sport Association Tokyo	Japan	Yuri Teduka	14	24	555	80	2264
4	Japan Mahjong Sport Association Tokyo	Japan	Yukari Kugimiya	51	16	139	80	2264
5	China Orient Qinghua Beida	China					79	2371
