= Mahjong International League =

Governing body for mahjong

- Abbreviation: MIL
- Formation: July 3, 2015
- Type: non-profit organization
- Legal status: Association
- Purpose: formulating the competition systems and rules suitable for the whole world in an effort to promote mahjong into a standard, professional and sportified global mind sport.
- Headquarters: Lausanne, Switzerland
- Members: 20 countries and regions
- Official language: English
- President: (Hong Kong) Frank Ng
- Website: Mahjong International League

The Mahjong International League (Chinese: 国际麻将联盟) is an international governing body for mahjong, recognized by the International Mind Sports Association (IMSA). Its registered office is located in Lausanne, Switzerland. As of 2016, its president is Frank Ng from Hong Kong.

== History ==
=== Establishment ===
The Mahjong International League (MIL) was founded in 2015, and it was registered in Lausanne, Switzerland. "Mahjong International League Establishment Ceremony" was held on May 11, 2015 in Diaoyutai State Guest Hotel in Beijing, China.

=== World Mahjong Sports Games ===
The 1st World Mahjong Sports Games (WMSG) was held from 24 to 28 October 2015, in the city of Sanya, Hainan Province, China.

Bo Tang from China won the individual competition, and Team Chinese B won the team competition.

=== Recognition of IMSA ===
On February 26, 2016, MIL was recognized as an observer by International Mind Sport Association (IMSA) after a presentation by Frank Ng, the president of MIL. As of 5 April 2017 Mahjong is the sixth official game to be played at IMSA Elite Games.

== Members (36) ==
In June 2021:

=== Asia (10) ===
1. China
2. Japan
3. South Korea
4. Hong Kong
5. Macau
6. Chinese Taipei
7. Singapore
8. Indonesia
9. Thailand
10. Vietnam

=== Europe (14) ===
1. Denmark
2. Italy
3. Russia
4. Germany
5. Switzerland
6. Spain
7. Belgium
8. Austria
9. Czech Republic
10. Hungary
11. Portugal
12. Slovakia
13. Sweden
14. Ukraine

=== Americas (7) ===
1. Canada
2. United States
3. Brazil
4. Argentina
5. Chile
6. Colombia
7. Mexico

=== Africa (3) ===
1. Réunion
2. Mauritius
3. South Africa

=== Oceania (2) ===
1. Australia
2. New Zealand

== See also ==
- Mahjong
- World Mahjong Organization (WMO)
- World Mahjong Sports Games
- International Online Riichi Mahjong Competition
