= Laura Miller (anthropologist) =

American anthropologist

- Born: December 15, 1953 (age 72)

Academic background
- Education: University of California, Santa Barbara (BA); University of California, Los Angeles (MA, PhD)

Academic work
- Discipline: Anthropologist
- Sub-discipline: Linguistic anthropology; Japanese studies
- Institutions: University of Missouri–St. Louis

Laura Miller (born December 15, 1953) is an American anthropologist and the Ei'ichi Shibusawa-Seigo Arai Endowed Professor of Japanese Studies and Professor of History at the University of Missouri–St. Louis. She held various academic positions and jobs in both the United States and Japan before accepting this named chair in 2010.

== Early life ==
Miller is a Californio, a descendant of the founding settlers and escort soldiers of the Pueblo de Los Angeles (present day Los Angeles, California) in 1781. She graduated from the University of California, Santa Barbara with a double major in Asian studies and anthropology in 1977, and completed a Master of Arts degree in anthropology from the University of California, Los Angeles in 1983 on the topic of aizuchi Japanese listening behavior. Her 1988 UCLA doctorate in anthropology was a linguistic anthropology study of interethnic communication among co-workers in Japan.

== Academic work ==
Miller's research interests are in the fields of interdisciplinary Japan studies and linguistic anthropology. She has done research on diverse topics, including divination, the kawaii aesthetic, conduct literature, youth fashion and the beauty industry, and historic figures such as Himiko and Abe no Seimei. Her linguistic anthropology research has included studies of Japanese youth slang, writing systems, gendered linguistic performances, folklinguistic theories, loanwords, and interethnic communication. Miller also produced some research on Russian language acquisition.

Miller has served as the president of Midwest Conference on Asian Affairs in 2019. In 2022, she served on the American Advisory Committee for Japanese Studies for the Japan Foundation.

== Selected publications ==
=== Books ===
Occult Hunting and Supernatural Play in Japan. University of Hawaii Press, 2024.

Diva Nation: Female Icons from Japanese Cultural History. Edited by Laura Miller and Rebecca Copeland. University of California Press, 2018.

Modern Girls on the Go: Gender, Mobility, and Labor in Japan. Edited by Alisa Freedman, Laura Miller, and Christine Yano. Stanford University Press, 2013.

Manners and Mischief: Gender, Power, and Etiquette in Japan. Edited by Jan Bardsley and Laura Miller. University of California Press, 2011.

Beauty Up: Exploring Contemporary Japanese Body Aesthetics. University of California Press, 2006.

Bad Girls of Japan. Edited by Laura Miller and Jan Bardsley. Palgrave Macmillan, 2005.

=== Selected book chapters and journal articles ===
Reconnecting to Japan's Past: Finding Roots through Cosplay and Historical Costume Rental. Mechademia, An Annual Forum for Anime, Manga and the Fan Arts. University of Minnesota Press, 2024.

"Purikura: Expressive energy in female self photography." In Introducing Japanese Popular Culture, edited by Alisa Freedman and Toby Slade. Routledge, 2017.

"Girl culture in East Asia." Transnational Asia: an online interdisciplinary journal 1(2) 2017.

"Japanese tarot cards." ASIA Network Exchange: A Journal for Asian Studies in the Liberal Art 24 (1), 2017.

"Japan’s trendy Word Grand Prix and Kanji of the Year: Commodified language forms in multiple contexts." In Language and Materiality: Ethnographic and Theoretical Explorations, edited by Jillian Cavanaugh and Shalini Shankar. Cambridge University Press, 2017.

"Linguistic folk theories and foreign celebrities of the past." Japanese Language and Literature 49 (2), 2015.

"Rebranding Himiko, the Shaman Queen of Ancient History." Mechademia, An Annual Forum for Anime, Manga and the Fan Arts. University of Minnesota Press, 2014.

"Cute masquerade and the pimping of Japan." International Journal of Japanese Sociology 20 (1), 2011.

"Subversive script and novel graphs in Japanese girls’ culture." Language & Communication 31 (1), 2011.

"Japan’s Zoomorphic Urge." ASIA Network Exchange: A Journal for Asian Studies in the Liberal Arts 18 (1), 2010.

"Extreme Makeover for a Heian-Era Wizard." Mechademia: An Annual Forum for Anime, Manga and the Fan Arts. University of Minnesota Press, 2008.

"Those naughty teenage girls: Japanese Kogals, slang, and media assessments." Journal of Linguistic Anthropology 14 (2), 2004.

"You are doing burikko! Censoring/scrutinizing artificers of cute femininity in Japanese." In Japanese Language, Gender, and Ideology: Cultural Models and Real People, edited by Shigeko Okamoto and Janet Shibamoto Smith. Oxford University Press, 2004.

"Wasei eigo: English ‘loanwords’ coined in Japan." In The Life of Language: Papers in Linguistics in Honor of William Bright, edited by Jane Hill, P.J. Mistry and Lyle Campbell. Mouton/De Gruyter, 1997.

"Folklinguistic theories of language learning" (with Ralph Ginsberg). In Second Language Acquisition in a Study Abroad Context, edited by Barbara F. Freed, John Benjamins, 1995.

"Two aspects of Japanese and American co-worker interaction: Giving instruction and creating rapport." Journal of Applied Behavioral Sciences 31 (2), 1995.

"Japanese and American indirectness." Journal of Asian and Pacific Communication 5 (1 & 2), 1994.

"Japanese and American meetings and what goes on before them." Pragmatics 4 (2), 1994.

"Verbal listening behavior in conversations between Japanese and Americans." In The Pragmatics of Intercultural and International Communication, edited by Jan Blommaert and Jef Verschueren, John Benjamins, 1991.

"The Japanese language and honorific speech: Is there a nihongo without keigo?" Penn Review of Linguistics 13, 1989.
