= Shohakusha =

Japanese publishing company

- Native name: 株式会社松柏社
- Romanized name: Kabushiki-gaisha Shōhakusha
- Company type: KK
- Industry: Publishing
- Genre: Textbooks, social science
- Founded: August 1, 1948; 77 years ago
- Headquarters: Iidabashi, Chiyoda, Tokyo, Japan
- Area served: Japan
- Products: Books
- Website: www.shohakusha.com

Shohakusha Publishing Co., Ltd. (株式会社松柏社, Kabushiki-gaisha Shōhakusha) is a Japanese publishing company headquartered in Iidabashi, Chiyoda, Tokyo. It publishes textbooks about the English language, American literature, British literature, and other social science books, in addition to books about other subjects.
