= European Riichi Championship =

The European Riichi Mahjong Championship (ERMC) is the European competition of mahjong certified by European Mahjong Association (EMA) under slightly modified Japanese rules. Both men and women are eligible to contest this title. It was established in 2008. The rules were updated in 2025.

The name was "European Riichi Championship" (ERC) until 2013.

== Champions ==
=== Individual ===
Year	Winner	Runner-up	Third place
2008	Thomas Kragh (DEN)	Benjamin Boas (USA)	Song Ping (CHN)
2010	Maurice Demmer (NED)	Joël Ratsimandresy (FRA)	David Bresnick (USA)
2013	Martin Diviš (CZE)	Michael Zahradnik (GER)	Maude Grimberg (FRA)
2016	Mikhail Lugovkin (RUS)	Désirée Heemskerk (NED)	Mateusz Woźniak (POL)
2019	Vladimir Nadanyan (RUS)	Vladimir Zayakin (RUS)	Hiroshi Yamai (JAP)
2024	Claude Sessin (FRA)	Anastasiia Veremenko (UKR)	Junjie Sun (CHN)

=== Team ===
No.	Winners		Runner-ups		Third place	
3	Red Dragons	Tina Christensen (DEN)	Ryan Pin	Alexander Wankmüller (AUT)	Ukelele	Gemma Collinge (GBR)
3	Red Dragons	Kim Iversen (DEN)	Ryan Pin	Tanja Wankmüller (AUT)	Ukelele	John Duckworth (GBR)
3	Red Dragons	Henrik Leth (DEN)	Ryan Pin	Manuel Reisinger (AUT)	Ukelele	Ian Fraser (GBR)
3	Red Dragons	Frank Rostved (DEN)	Ryan Pin	Manuel Tomisser (AUT)	Ukelele	Martin Lester (GBR)

== Venues ==
Date	Edition	Location	Venue
June 21–22, 2008	1st European Riichi Championship 2008	Hanover, Germany	
July 10–11, 2010	2nd European Riichi Championship 2010	Hanover, Germany	Jazzclub Hannover
September 18–22, 2013	3rd European Riichi Championship 2013	Bad Vöslau, Austria	Weingut Schlossberg
October 7–9, 2016	4th European Riichi Mahjong Championship 2016	Farnham, United Kingdom	The Great Hall, The Farnham Maltings
June 21–23, 2019	5th European Riichi Mahjong Championship 2019	Rosmalen, Netherlands	De Kentering Party-Events-Food
December 5–8, 2024	6th European Riichi Mahjong Championship 2024	Valencia, Spain	Hotel Port Azafata
August 5-8, 2027	7th European Riichi Mahjong Championship 2027	Katowice, Poland	International Congress Centre in Katowice

== See also ==
- European Mahjong Association (EMA)
- Open European Mahjong Championship (Another European Championship held by EMA)
