= Aegyo =

Korean cute displays of affection

- Hangul: 애교
- Hanja: 愛嬌
- RR: aegyo
- MR: aegyo
- IPA: [ɛ(ː)ɡjo]

Aegyo (Korean: 애교), in Korean culture, is a gendered performance of cuteness, involving appeals to affection often expressed through a sweet baby-like voice and particular changes to speech, facial expressions, and gestures. A similar expression is gyotae (교태; 嬌態; [kjotʰɛ]). Aegyo literally means behaving in a flirtatious, coquettish manner and it is commonly expected for both male and female K-pop idols and also expected or demanded from exclusively younger females in Korean society in a way which reinforces or reflects Korea's traditional gender roles. However, it is not uncommon for everyday people to behave in such a way, and is widely used as an expression of affection towards loved ones, family, and friends, and also as a hyper-sexualized form of seduction. Aegyo can also display closeness with others, which is possible to bring people together. The word is often translated as "cuteness" in English, and can be compared to the Chinese concept of sājiāo (撒嬌), or the Japanese concepts of kawaii and amae.

== Use ==
In their study, scholar Aljosa Puzar and Hong Yewon argue that "aegyo is almost certainly a strong contributing element to the discursive organisation of the 'ideal Korean woman', repeatedly reinforced by narratives and images produced and reproduced throughout everyday lives and mediatic representations." Puzar and Hong additionally conclude that aegyo is essentially in the end how Korean women navigate what "amounts to societal oppression" and that aegyo is essentially a reflection of an unequal power distribution in South Korea.

In some or many cases, men expect this behavior to be "innate" or spontaneous. This means that men expect women to be naturally cute and submissive—-and imagine that this behavior is natural for women instead of a result of cultural expectations. Generally, men welcome this behavior only when it is viewed as natural, so women are expected to perform this behavior in a way that it seems natural or can be imagined as innate by the man, essentially meaning that men expect or believe that this highly infantilized and submissive woman is a "natural" state or behavior.

== Linguistics ==
Aegyo is not limited to simply "acting cute", and includes several changes to speech, such as affrication, stopping, and /j/ insertion. Aegyo is essentially baby talk, with these changes to speech meant to mimic children. For example, replacing yo (요) at the end of a phrase with yeo (여) or yong (용).

=== Speech levels and contemporary use ===
Aegyo operates within the broader framework of Korean speech levels, in which sentence endings and speech style indicate age differences, relative status, and social distance. Instead of a binary distinction between "formal" and "informal" language, speakers strategically position themselves in relation to their interlocutors. As a result, aegyo attains social significance by modifying established patterns of polite and intimate speech, rather than functioning as a separate register. Playful modifications of sentence-final forms, such as variants of the polite ending -yo, allow speakers to express softness, affection, and emotional nuance while maintaining attentiveness to the listener and the relationship Due to the strong association between Korean speech levels, hierarchy, and age, the use of aegyo underscores who is authorized to employ a cute speech style, toward whom, and in which contexts. identifies aegyo as a specialized register for expressing affection and cuteness, particularly in interactions with intimate interlocutors, and documents its occurrence in both spoken Korean and written communication on Twitter. This evidence demonstrates that the social meaning of sentence endings is variable. Although a polite ending may signal deference, stylized aegyo can also convey warmth, closeness, or playful dependence. Therefore, Korean speech style can simultaneously index respect and intimacy, rather than conveying a singular social meaning.

Crosby also argues that aegyo represents a socially recognizable style that encompasses both linguistic and non-linguistic features. In a study of couples in the Seoul area, participants most frequently associated aegyo with nasality and a distinctive rising-falling intonation pattern, with younger speakers more likely to connect phonetic and phonological variants to aegyo. Crosby further suggests that aegyo and its nasal qualities function as forms of positive politeness, signaling whining, caring, and affectionate stances. This perspective is important for understanding Korean speech levels, as it shows that social hierarchy is negotiated not only through honorific grammar or strict formality. Speakers also foster closeness by integrating affective cues into polite or semi-polite forms, especially in romantic or intimate relationships

Speech-level variation in aegyo has become increasingly visible among younger generations through digital communication. Jang's corpus analysis of Twitter data shows that aegyo is actively represented in text, with users altering spellings and endings to convey cuteness in writing as well as in speech. Crosby's dissertation similarly includes aegyo-like text messages in participant readings, demonstrating that these forms circulate across both spoken and written interactions rather than being limited to face-to-face conversation . As a result, social media allows younger speakers to adapt speech-level markers from offline contexts as stylized indicators of intimacy, humor, or personal identity.

== Relation to gender roles and sexism ==
Puzar and Hong argue that aegyo is a manifestation of patriarchy and gender roles in everyday life. They argue women can either explicitly choose to use aegyo for social reasons or are pressured into doing so by societal expectations. The Asia Pacific Journal of Anthropology describes aegyo as a "layered phenomenon standing in productive relations with other ideas and concepts typical of Korean remaining hierarchical (patriarchal and gerontocratic) societal organisation."

Puzar argues that aegyo in popular culture affects how young South Korean women act, especially in romantic relationships. For example, using cute hand gestures and expressions in photos are common behaviors among many young women in South Korea.

The relationship between speech levels and age is particularly apparent in assessments of aegyo. Jang's experimental findings indicate that women are more perceptive than men regarding differences in the perceived cuteness of specific aegyo variants, and that older participants are more sensitive than younger ones; women over thirty display the highest sensitivity . These findings suggest that choices about speech levels are interpreted within broader cultural frameworks of maturity and appropriate conduct. Older speakers experience increased pressure to use mature language, rendering their use of childlike or playful forms especially noticeable. Consequently, aegyo exemplifies how Korean speech styles are influenced by both age-related expectations and grammatical norms.

However, younger generations have not severed the connection between speech style and social judgment. A 2026 report on Korean "short tongue" perception found that South Korean adults often evaluated baby-talk-like pronunciation more positively when it was associated with aegyo and with women, compared to when it was assessed outside that context. The report further observed that responses varied depending on the type of pronunciation and the speaker's gender, indicating that cute speech remains subject to social regulation rather than being exempt from hierarchy or stereotype ("KU Study Finds Women More Often Linked to 'Aegyo,'" 2026). These findings suggest that while contemporary uses of speech-level variation in social media and popular discourse may be more playful and widespread, they remain shaped by expectations regarding age, gender, and relational appropriateness.

== See also ==
- Bishōjo
- Bishōnen
- Burikko
- Kawaii
- Kkonminam
- Moe
- Ulzzang
