= 2nd World Mahjong Championship 2010 =

The 2nd World Mahjong Championship 2010 was held at the Nationaal Denksport Centrum 'Den Hommel' in Utrecht, Netherlands from August 27 to 29, in 2010.

== Championship ==
In this competition, there was a national team system which awards top 3 players in each country instead of the team system.

== Results ==
The names are ordered as Given name and Surname.

Rank	Name	Nationality	Table Points	Mini Points
1	Linghua Jiao	China	32	1424
2	Olivier Boivin	France	30	1318
3	Elisabeth Frischenschlager	Austria	29	1124
4	Huaou Xu	China	27	769
5	Jesper Willemoes Hansen	Denmark	27	480
6	Jianguo Liang	China	26	1061
7	Lifang Tong	China	26	857
8	Nadine König	Germany	26	748
9	Bingcheng Zhang	China	26	627
10	Moa Henriët	Sweden	26	571

=== National top players ===
Rank	Name	Nationality	Members	Rank	Table Points	Mini Points	Total Table Points	Total Mini Points
1	China	China	Linghua Jiao	1	32	1424	85	3254
1	China	China	Huaou Xu	4	27	769	85	3254
1	China	China	Jianguo Liang	6	26	1061	85	3254
2	France	France	Olivier Boivin	2	30	1318	78	2565
2	France	France	Joel Ratsimandresy	17	24	674	78	2565
2	France	France	Nathalie Mahé	19	24	573	78	2565
3	Denmark	Denmark	Jesper Willemoes Hansen	5	27	480	77	1766
3	Denmark	Denmark	Shi Hua Chen Kold	12	25	785	77	1766
3	Denmark	Denmark	Jeppe Stig Nielsen	14	25	501	77	1766
4	Japan	Japan	Yaichirō Ōwaki	13	25	596	71	1717
4	Japan	Japan	Teruhiko Araki	18	24	608	71	1717
4	Japan	Japan	Katsuyuki Onodera	28	22	513	71	1717
5	Italy	Italy	Marco Bazzocchi	1	24	524	69	1852
5	Italy	Italy	Patrizia Buscarini	21	23	545	69	1852
5	Italy	Italy	Luca Gavelli	25	22	783	69	1852

== Participating countries ==
208 competitors from 13 countries participated. 8 Chinese competitors did not show up in the competition at the first day.

- Austria ()
- Belgium ()
- China ()
- Japan ()
- Hungary ()
- Denmark ()
- Netherlands ()
- Russia ()
- Spain ()
- Germany ()
- Italy ()
- France ()
- Sweden ()
