= World Mahjong Organization =

- Abbreviation: WMO
- Formation: 30 October 2005
- Type: Nonprofit Organization
- Legal status: Organization
- Purpose: strengthen communication and exchanges; promote the Olympic spirit; promote healthy, scientific and friendly Mahjong culture; improve international mahjong competition rules
- Headquarters: Haidian District, Beijing, China
- Members: 12 national organizations
- Official language: Chinese; English; Japanese
- President: (China) Guangyuan Yu
- Affiliations: European Mahjong Association
- Website: World Mahjong Network

The World Mahjong Organization (Chinese: 世界麻将组织) is the international governing body of mahjong in its variation called MCR (Mahjong Competition Rules, Chinese: 麻将竞赛规则), also known as Chinese official rules. Its headquarters is located in Beijing, China. As of 2015, its president is Jiang Xueqi.

== History ==
=== Before establishment ===
Mahjong originated in China and spread around the world, although with varied rule sets. In China, mahjong was identified as an illegal gambling game and it was forbidden to develop businesses based on it, so nobody could establish a professional mahjong organization. This interfered with the development of mahjong as a sport, and it was considered simply as home entertainment until 1998.

Japan accepted mahjong before World War II. After the war, many professional organizations were established there and a large market developed. However, mahjong had a bad image in Japan too, because it had been developed as a gambling game. For this reason, mahjong came close to being made illegal. Some mahjong players started a movement to change its image in the 1980s, and they changed the rules and established the Japan Kenko Mahjong Association in 1988. Kenko means "health" in Japanese. Their motto was "No Gambling, No Drinking, No Smoking". They organized a "Healthy Mahjong" competition in Tokyo in 1995. With that as a start, they also promoted competitions, on a scale of a hundred competitors, around China, including Beijing. They also put pressure on the Chinese sports authorities to recognise mahjong as a sport.

In January 1998, mahjong became the 255th sport to be officially recognised by the General Administration of Sport of China. In September 1998, the unified rules for international competitions were established.

On 23–26 October 2002, the first World Mahjong Championship was held at the Hotel Grand Palace in Iidabashi, Tokyo. It was organized by the Mahjong Museum, the Japan Mahjong Organizing Committee(JMOC) and the Ningbo Mahjong Sport Association. Originally, it was going to be held in Ningbo, China, but it was moved because Ningbo was going to have another large event at the same time. A hundred players participated in this championship, in twenty-five teams from eight nations: China, Japan, United States, Taiwan, Russia, Sweden, Netherlands and Bulgaria. Mai Hatsune, the female mahjong player from Japan, won the individual championship, and Japan Mahjong Players Apprentice Selected Team B won the team championship. John O'Connor, a Japan-based American tarento, was the runner-up.

=== Establishment ===
The WMO was established in 2006 in Beijing. Guangyuan Yu was chosen as the first president and Xuanqi Jiang was chosen as the Secretary General.

At the congress on 2 November 2007 in the Foguang Hall of the Hongzhushan Hotel, Sichuan, China, it was decided that the world championship is to be held every two years and that Chinese, English and Japanese are the official languages of the WMO.

=== World championship ===
The first world championship was held in Chengdu, Sichuan on 1–5 November 2007. 148 players from 16 nations participated. Li Li from China won the individual championship, and China Shanxi Jiexiu won the team championship.

The second world championship was held in Utrecht, Netherlands on 27–29 August 2010. The current world champion is Linghua Jiao from China and the national team championship was also won by China. For the first time, Eupropean players and countries took second and third places in both the individual and the team championships.

== See also ==
- Mahjong
- European Mahjong Association (EMA)
- World Series Of Mahjong (another world championship, promoted by World Mahjong Ltd)
- Mahjong International League
