= Mai Hatsune =

Japanese Mahjong player

Mai Hatsune (初音 舞, Hatsune Mai; Japanese pronunciation: [hatsɯne mai]; born December 25, 1978) as known as "Dragon Lady" is a Japanese Mahjong player. She is the first world champion of Mahjong. Her real name is Fumiko Itabashi (板橋史子). She is known not only for competing in Mahjong, but for writing and instructing.

== Biography ==
=== Debut ===
She debuted as a professional mahjong player of Saikouisen Japan Professional Mahjong Association. At this time she used her real name. A few years later, she moved to Japan Professional Mahjong Association, another professional organization. At this time, she started using the name "Mai Hatsune", her stage name.

In 2002, she participated The 1st Mahjong San Queen Cup, and she came from behind and won the championship. The San Queen Cup is the television tournament promoted by San Group which was managing 16 mahjong parlors in Japan. San Group is currently managing 26 mahjong parlors.

In August, she participated in the Final of 2002 World Mahjong Championship Women Players Japanese National Team Qualifying tournament in Kanda, Tokyo, but she lost.

=== Winning world titles ===
On October 23, 2002, she participated 2002 World Mahjong Championship in Tokyo, won the championship with points of 26 points. This point was same as John J. O'Connor, the player at 2nd place, but she won because her total points was 898 and it exceeded 139 points.

On June 25, 2005, she participated the first Open European Mahjong Championship in Nijmegen, Netherlands. Her final rank was 2nd place.

On December 31, 2005, she participated in the team competition "Mahjong Battle Royal 2006" promoted by Mondo21. This was a special television match among 4 teams between the end of year and the beginning of the year. She was offered to and accepted joining the "Women Mondo21 team". Her team won the match.

== Titles ==
- Individual
  - Mondo21 1st Mahjong San Queens Cup Tournament Winner
  - 2002 World Championship in Mahjong Individual Winner (October 23, 2002)
  - 1st Open European Mahjong Championship 2005 Individual 2nd place (June 25, 2005)
- Team
  - Mahjong Battle Royal 2006 Winner (January 1, 2006)

== Bibliography ==
- Mai Hatsune; Takunori Kajimoto (June 2005). 世界チャンピオン初音舞の世界に勝つ―麻雀国際公式ルール戦術本 (World Champion Hatsune Mai's Mahjong International Official Rule Tactics Book To Win The World) (in Japanese). Chiyoda, Tokyo, Japan: Takeshobo Co., LTD. ISBN 978-4812421901.
