= Iidabashi =

Iidabashi 飯田橋
- District
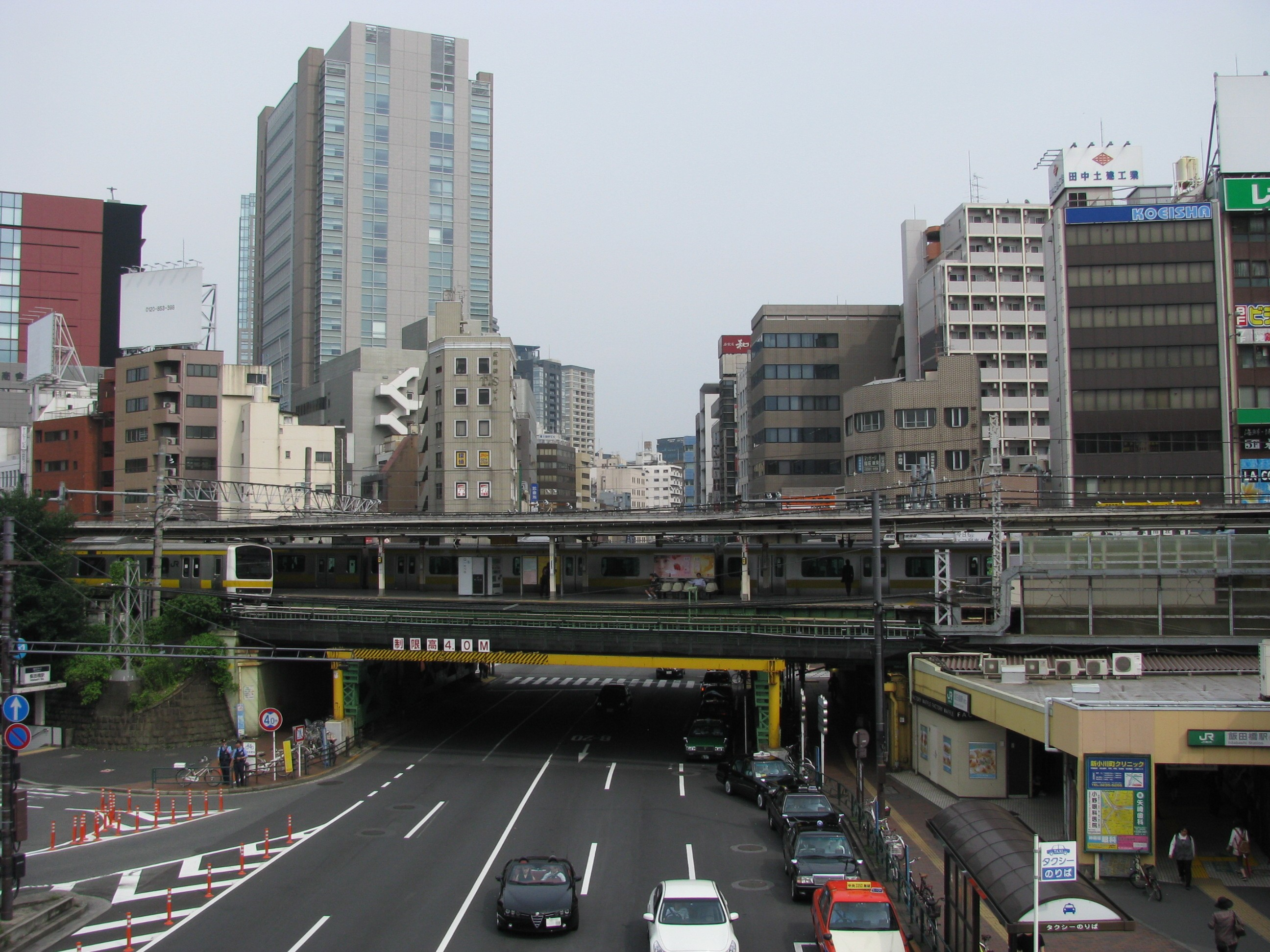
- Interactive map of Iidabashi
- Coordinates: 35°42′09″N 139°44′41″E
- Country: Japan
- City: Tokyo
- Ward: Chiyoda
- Area: Kōjimachi Area

Population (February 1, 2009)
  - Total: 2,707
- Time zone: UTC+9 (JST)
- Postal code: 102-0072
- Area code: 03

Iidabashi (飯田橋, Iidabashi) is a district of Chiyoda, Tokyo, Japan. It was in the former ward of Kōjimachi, which existed in Tokyo until 1947.

== Etymology ==
Iidabashi is named after a nearby bridge called Iida Bridge (飯田橋, Iidabashi), itself named after an Edo-period farmer, Iida Kihee (飯田喜兵衛, Iida Kihee).

== Places ==
- Iidabashi Station
- Iida Bridge
- Kanda River

== Economy ==
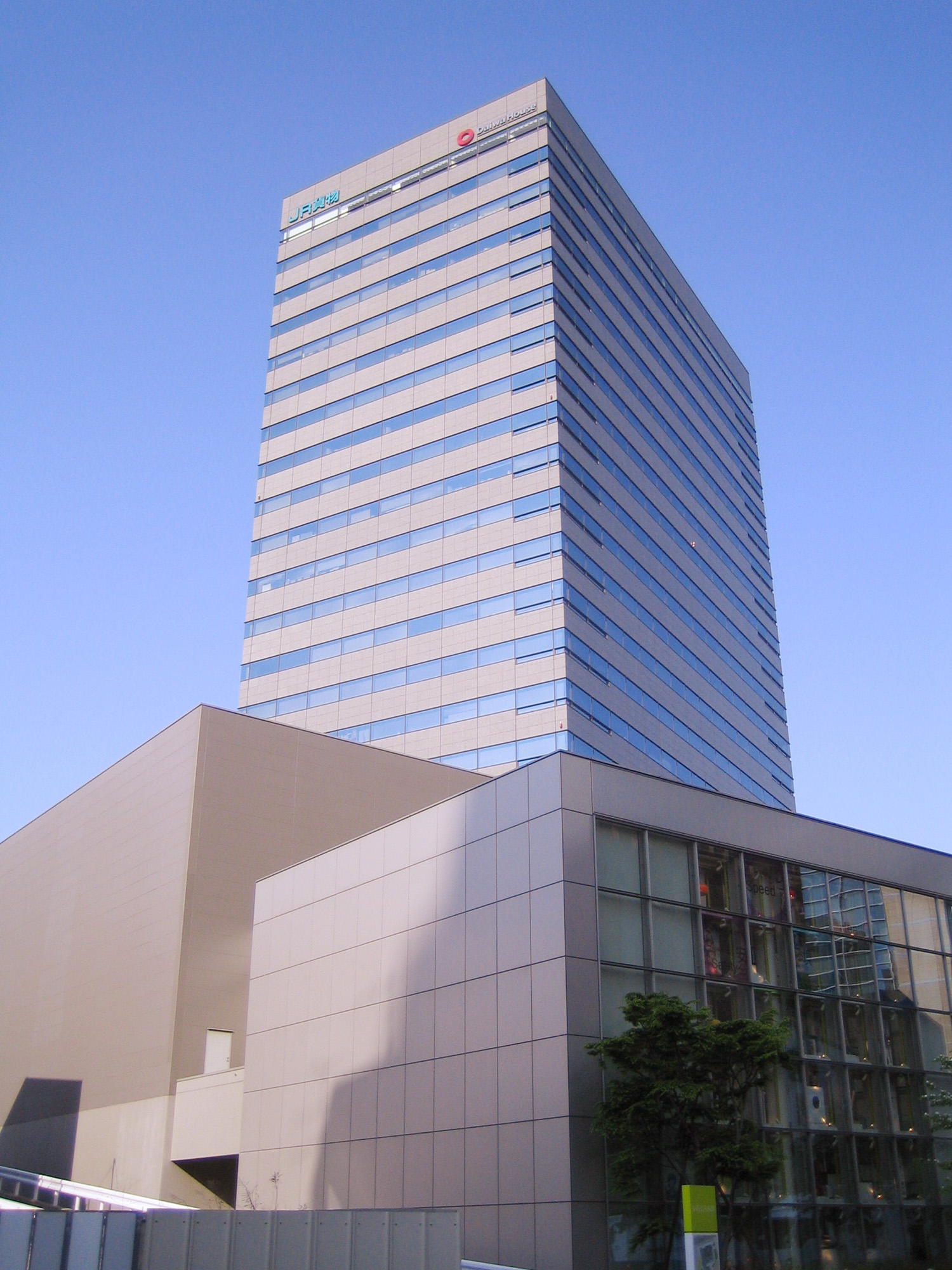
Japan Freight Railway Company headquarters

Several companies have their headquarters in Iidabashi, among them Japan Freight Railway Company, KDDI Nikken Sekkei, and Shohakusha.

== Education ==
Chiyoda Board of Education operates public elementary and junior high schools. Fujimi Elementary School (富士見小学校) is the zoned elementary school for Iidabashi 1-4 chōme. There is a freedom of choice system for junior high schools in Chiyoda Ward, and so there are no specific junior high school zones.
