= Kawaii =

Japanese cultural phenomenon

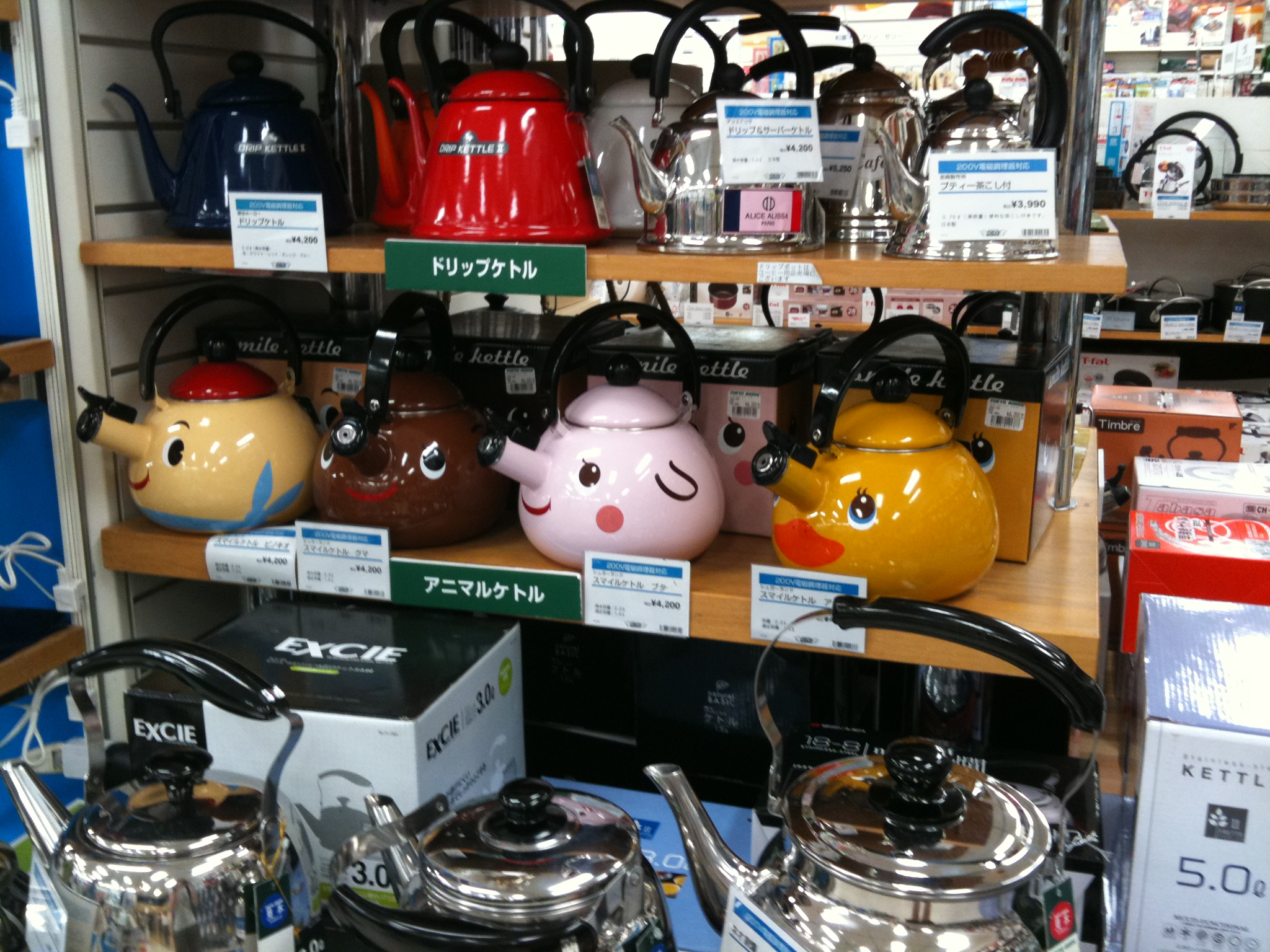
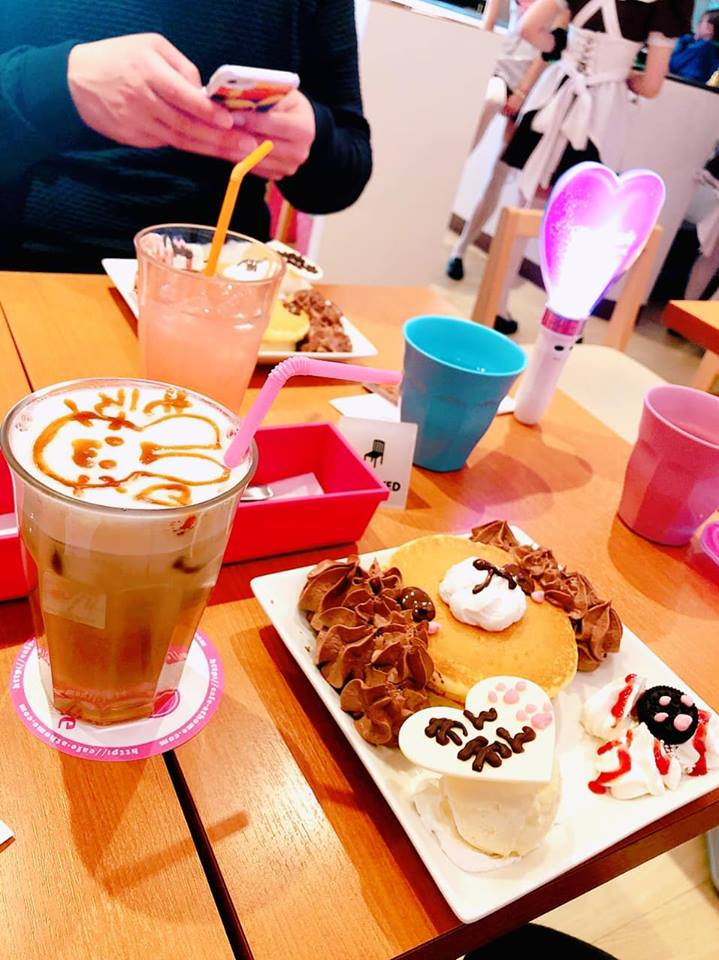
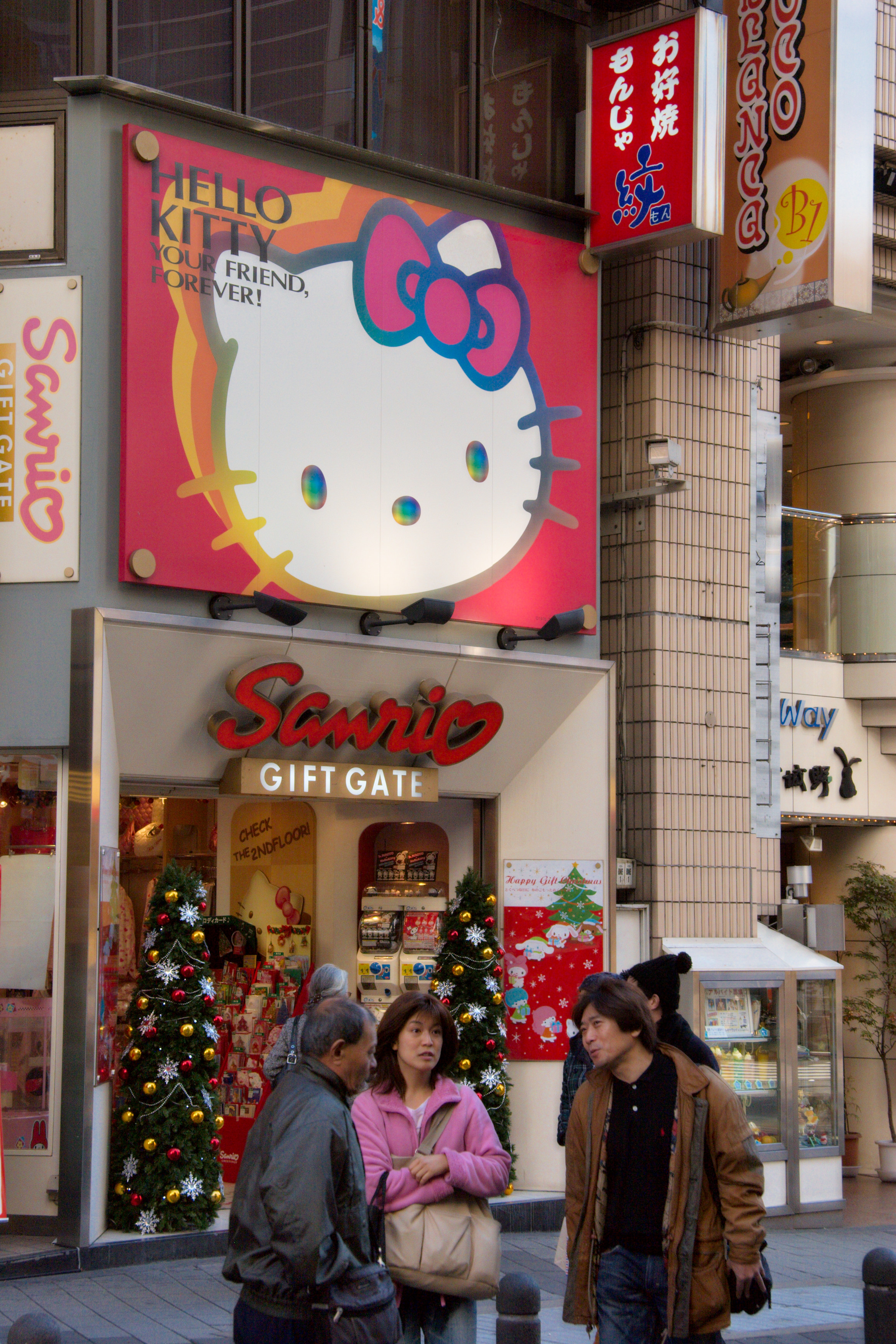
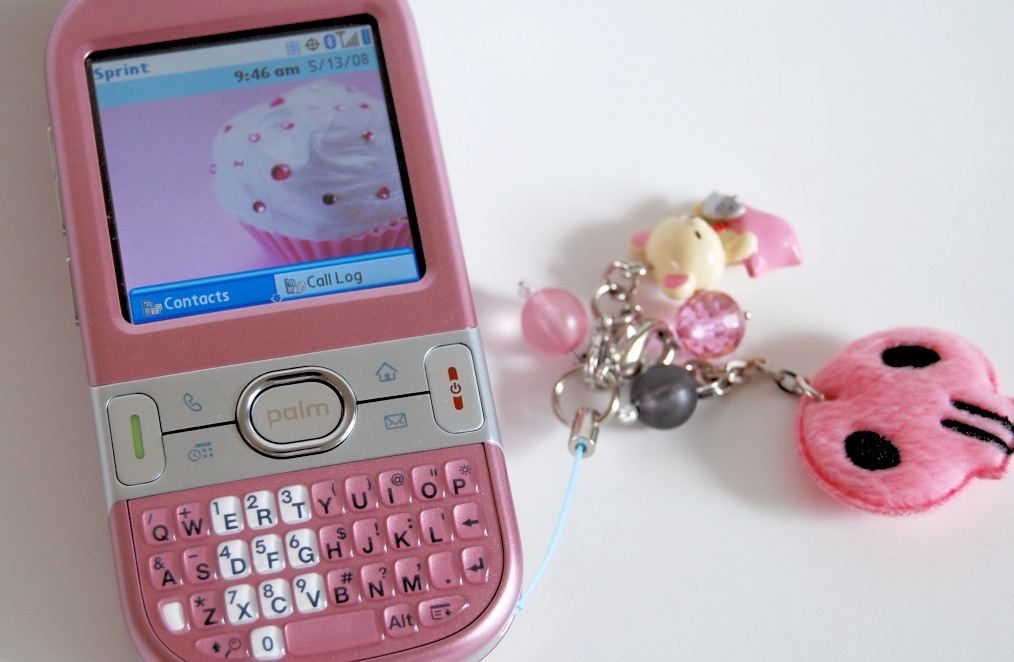
Left to right, top to bottom: shelf of decorated tea kettles; food served at a maid café; Hello Kitty on a sign in Ikebukuro, Tokyo; mobile phone charm attached to a pink Palm Centro

Kawaii (Japanese: かわいい or 可愛い, [kawaiꜜi]; 'cute' or 'adorable') is a Japanese cultural phenomenon which emphasizes cuteness, childlike innocence, charm, and simplicity. Kawaii culture began to flourish in the 1970s, driven by youth culture and the rise of cute characters in manga and anime (comics and animation) and merchandise, exemplified by the creation of Hello Kitty by Sanrio in 1974. The kawaii aesthetic is characterized by soft or pastel (usually pink, blue, and white) colors, rounded shapes, and features which evoke vulnerability, such as big eyes and small mouths, and has become a prominent aspect of Japanese popular culture, influencing entertainment (including toys and idols), fashion (such as Lolita fashion), advertising, and product design.

== Etymology ==
The word kawaii originally derives from the phrase 顔映し kao hayushi, which literally means "(one's) face (is) aglow," commonly used to refer to flushing or blushing of the face/cheek. The second morpheme is cognate with -bayu in mabayui (眩い, 目映い, or 目映ゆい) "dazzling, glaring, blinding, too bright; dazzlingly beautiful" (ma- is from 目 me "eye") and -hayu in omohayui (面映ゆい) "embarrassed/embarrassing, awkward, feeling self-conscious/making one feel self-conscious" (omo- is from 面 omo, an archaic word for "face, looks, features; surface; image, semblance, vestige"). Over time, the meaning changed into the modern meaning of "cute" or "pretty", and the pronunciation changed to かわゆい kawayui and then to the modern かわいい kawaii. It is commonly written in hiragana, かわいい, but the ateji, 可愛い, is also frequently used. The romanized kanji in the ateji literally translates to "able to love/be loved, can/may love, lovable."

Various modern Standard Japanese words have related meanings such as the adjectival noun かわいそう kawaisō (often written with ateji as 可哀相 or 可哀想) "piteous, pitiable, arousing compassion, poor, sad, sorry" (etymologically from 顔映ゆい "face / projecting, reflecting, or transmitting light, flushing, blushing / seeming, appearance"). Forms of kawaii and its derivatives kawaisō and kawairashii (with the suffix -rashii "-like, -ly") are used in modern dialects to mean "embarrassing/embarrassed, shameful/ashamed" or "good, nice, fine, excellent, superb, splendid, admirable".

== History ==
=== Precursors ===
The notion of kawaii is traditionally traced back to Sei Shōnagon's Pillow Book, composed between 900 and 1000, where in the section on "pretty things" she mentions several things that clearly fit the modern notion of cuteness (for example the face of a child drawn on a melon). Kawaii culture is an offshoot of Japanese girls' culture, which flourished with the creation of girls' secondary schools after 1899. The postponement of marriage and children that came with the expansion of education for girls allowed for the rise of a girl youth culture in shōjo magazines and shōjo manga directed at girls in the pre-war period.

=== Cute handwriting ===
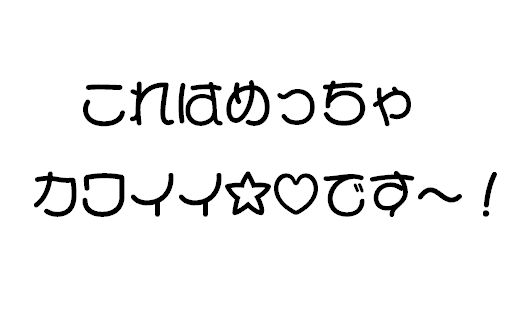
Example of marui ji, a kawaii Japanese handwriting style

In the 1970s, the popularity of the kawaii aesthetic inspired a style of writing. Many teenage girls contributed to the development of this style; the handwriting was made by writing laterally, often while using mechanical pencils. These pencils produced very fine lines, as opposed to traditional Japanese writing, which varied in thickness and was vertical. The teenage girls would also write in big, round characters and add little pictures to their writing, such as hearts, stars, emoticon faces, and letters of the Latin alphabet.

These pictures made the writing very difficult to read. As a result, the new writing style caused controversy and was banned in many schools. During the 1980s, however, "cute" writing was adopted by magazines and comics and was often key to packaging and advertising products, especially toys for children or "cute accessories".

From 1984 to 1986, Kazuma Yamane (山根一眞, Yamane Kazuma) studied the development of cute handwriting (which he called Anomalous Female Teenage Handwriting) in depth. This type of cute Japanese handwriting has also been called marui ji (丸い 字), meaning "round writing"; koneko ji (子猫字), meaning "kitten writing"; manga ji (漫画字), meaning "comic writing"; and burikko ji (鰤 子字), meaning "fake-child writing". Although it was commonly thought that the writing style was something that teenagers had picked up from comics, Kazuma found that teenagers had created the style themselves, spontaneously, as part of an 'underground trend'. His conclusion was based on the observation that cute handwriting predates the availability of the technical means for producing rounded writing in comics.

==== Use in Japanese language ====
Form	Japanese	Romaji	English
Present	かわいい	kawaii	cute
Present negative	かわいくない	kawaikunai	not cute
Past	かわいかった	kawaikatta	was cute
Past negative	かわいくなかった	kawaikunakatta	was not cute

Usage of Kawaii in Japanese is general and can be used in a variety of situations to describe aesthetics, to give a compliment, or to add a pleasantry or salutation to a conversation.

==== Electronic communications ====
The emoji U+1F4A0 💠 DIAMOND SHAPE WITH A DOT INSIDE resembles a blue flower with four petals. It is used in Japan as symbol for kawaii.

=== Cute merchandise ===
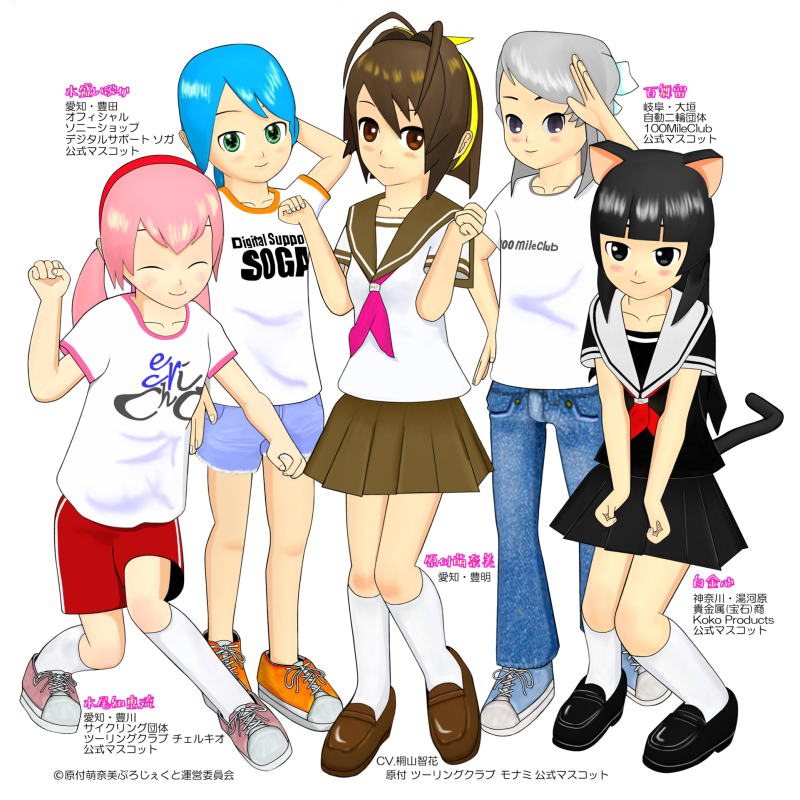
Baby-faced girl characters are rooted in Japanese society.

Tomoyuki Sugiyama (杉山奉文, Sugiyama Tomoyuki), author of Cool Japan, says cute fashion in Japan can be traced back to the Edo period with the popularity of netsuke. Illustrator Rune Naito, who produced illustrations of "large-headed" (nitōshin) baby-faced girls and cartoon animals for Japanese girls' magazines from the 1950s to the 1970s, is credited with pioneering what would become the culture and aesthetic of kawaii. In Rune's works, female figures seem to be from another world, with big "Bambi eyes", thick lips and brightly coloured clothing.

Because of this trend, companies such as Sanrio came out with merchandise like Hello Kitty. Hello Kitty was an immediate success and the obsession with cute continued to develop in other areas as well. More recently, Sanrio has released kawaii characters with deeper personalities that appeal to an older audience, such as Gudetama and Aggretsuko. These characters have enjoyed great popularity as fans are drawn to their quirks as well as their cute aesthetics. The 1980s also saw the rise of cute idols, such as Seiko Matsuda, who is largely credited with popularizing the style. Women began to emulate Seiko Matsuda and her cute fashion style and mannerisms, which emphasized the helplessness and innocence of young girls. The market for cute merchandise in Japan used to be driven by Japanese girls between 15 and 18 years old.

== Aesthetics ==
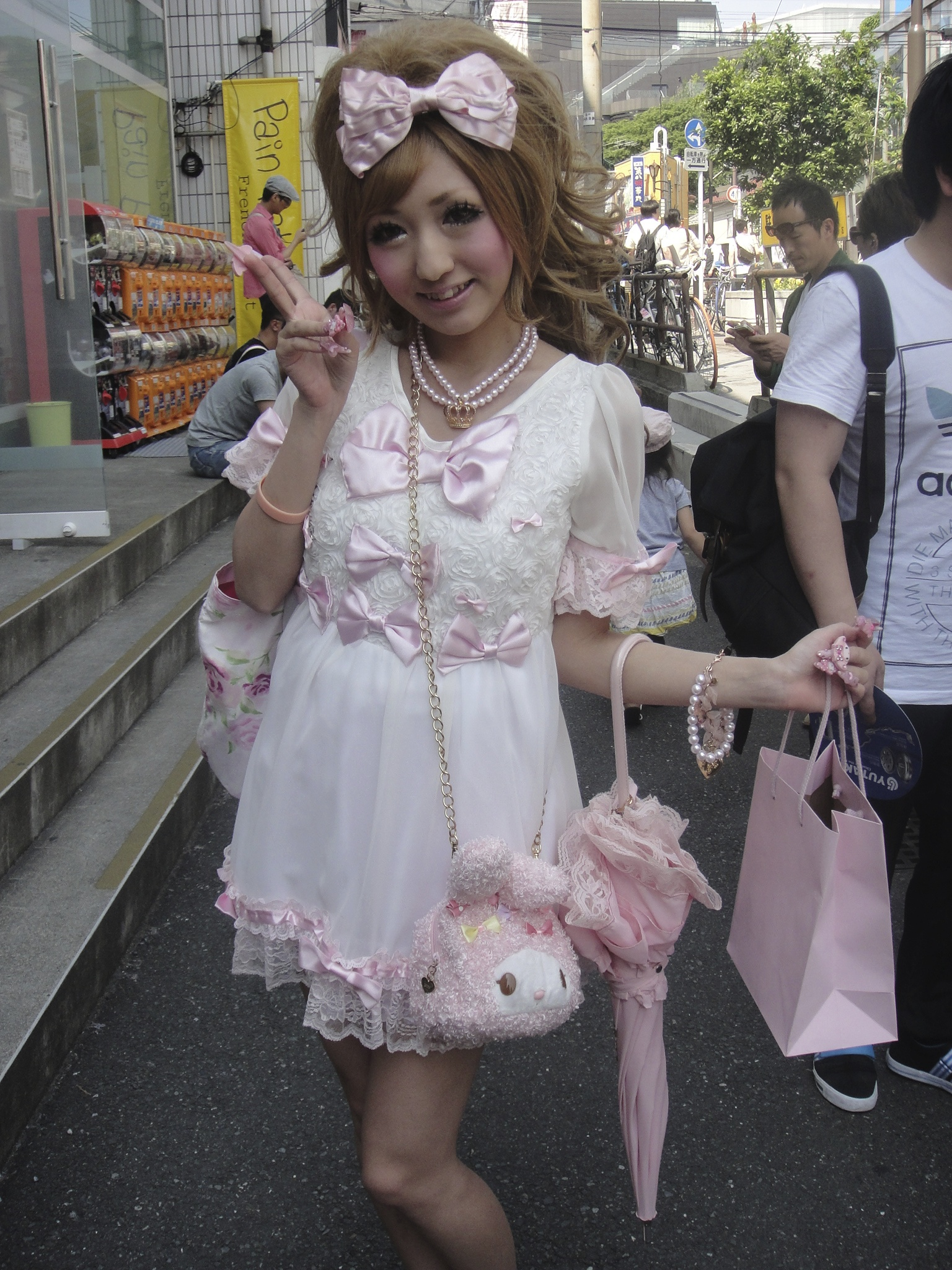
Hime gyaru or princess gyaru influencer, Himena Ousaki taken in 2012 as an example of Kawaii fashion

Soichi Masubuchi (増淵宗一, Masubuchi Sōichi), in his work Kawaii Syndrome, claims "cute" and "neat" have taken precedence over the former Japanese aesthetics of "beautiful" and "refined". As a cultural phenomenon, cuteness is increasingly accepted in Japan as a part of Japanese culture and national identity. Tomoyuki Sugiyama (杉山奉文, Sugiyama Tomoyuki), author of Cool Japan, believes that "cuteness" is rooted in Japan's harmony-loving culture, and Nobuyoshi Kurita (栗田経惟, Kurita Nobuyoshi), a sociology professor at Musashi University in Tokyo, has stated that "cute" is a "magic term" that encompasses everything that is acceptable and desirable in Japan.

=== Physical attractiveness ===
In Japan, being cute is acceptable for both men and women. A trend existed of men shaving their legs to mimic the neotenic look. A study by Kanebo, a cosmetic company, found that Japanese women in their 20s and 30s favored the "cute look" with a "childish round face". Women also employ a look of innocence in order to further play out this idea of cuteness. Having large eyes is one aspect that exemplifies innocence; therefore, many Japanese women attempt to alter the size of their eyes. To create this illusion, women may wear large contact lenses, false eyelashes, dramatic eye makeup, and even have an East Asian blepharoplasty, commonly known as double eyelid surgery.

=== Idols ===
Japanese idols (アイドル, aidoru) are media personalities in their teens and twenties who are considered particularly attractive or cute and who will, for a period ranging from several months to a few years, regularly appear in the mass media, e.g. as singers for pop groups, bit-part actors, TV personalities (tarento), models in photo spreads published in magazines, advertisements, etc. (But not every young celebrity is considered an idol. Young celebrities who wish to cultivate a rebellious image, such as many rock musicians, reject the "idol" label.) Speed, Morning Musume, AKB48, and Momoiro Clover Z are examples of popular idol groups in Japan during the 2000s & 2010s.

=== Cute fashion ===
==== Lolita ====
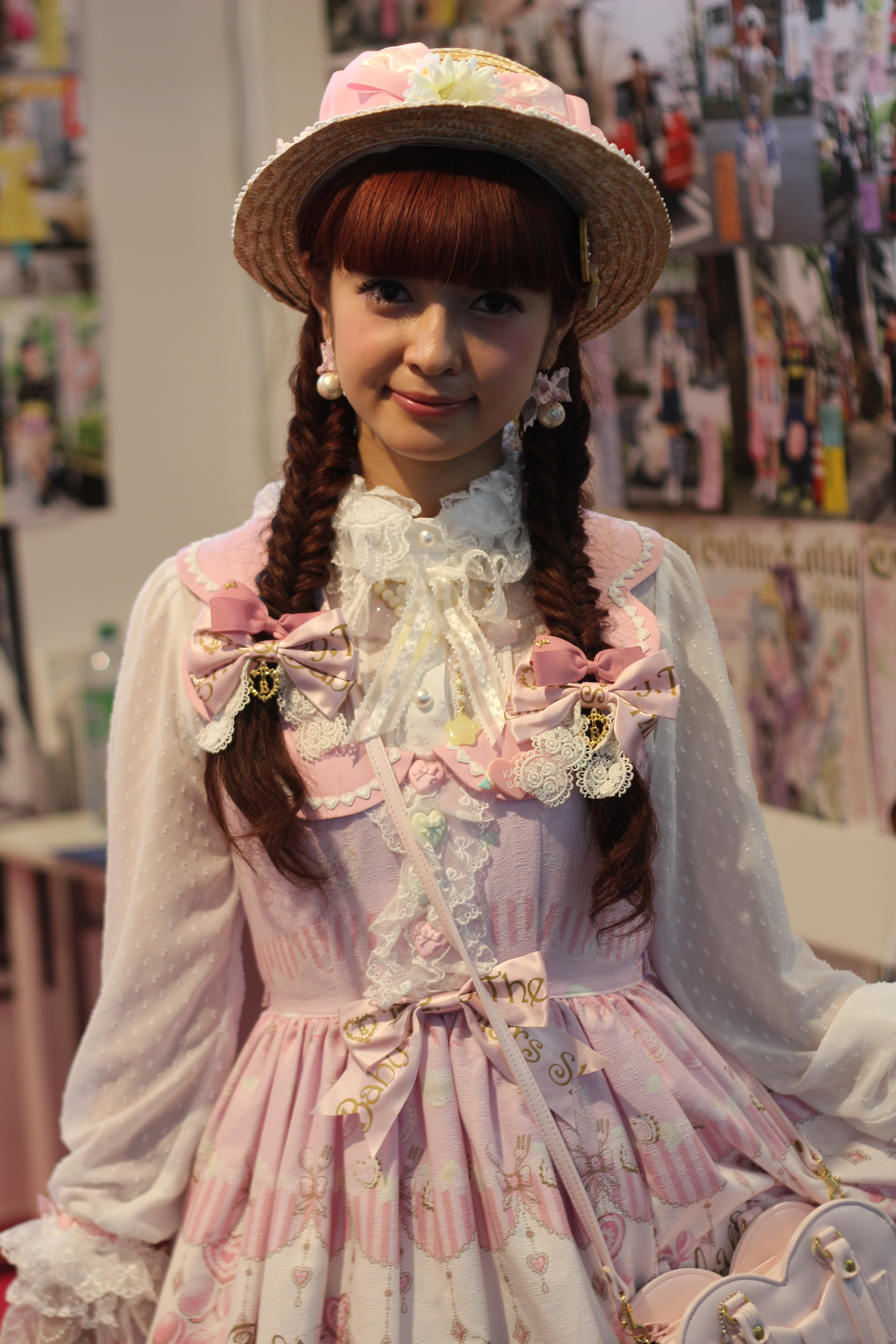
Misako Aoki (pictured in 2014) wearing lolita fashion

Lolita fashion is a well-known and recognizable style in Japan. Based on Victorian fashion and the Rococo period, elements of gothic style are combined with elements of the wearer’s personal style to achieve a porcelain-doll look. The intended goal of Lolita fashion is to create a cute, innocent, and elegant appearance. This look is achieved with laces, ribbons, bows, ruffles, bloomers, aprons, and ruffled petticoats. Parasols, chunky Mary Jane heels, and Bo Peep collars are also very popular.

Sweet Lolita is a subset of Lolita fashion that includes even more ribbons, bows, and lace and is often fabricated out of pastels and other light colors. Head-dresses such as giant bows or bonnets are also very common, while lighter make-up is sometimes used to achieve a more natural look. Curled hair extensions, sometimes accompanied by eyelash extensions, are also popular in helping with the baby doll look. Another cute fashion with some crossover in "sweet Lolita" is Fairy Kei.

Themes such as fruits, flowers, and sweets are often used as patterns on the fabrics used for dresses. Purses often go with the themes and are shaped like hearts, strawberries, or stuffed animals. Baby, the Stars Shine Bright is one of the more popular clothing stores for this style and often carries themes. Mannerisms are also important to many Sweet Lolitas. Sweet Lolita is sometimes not only a fashion but also a lifestyle. This is evident in the 2004 film Kamikaze Girls where the main Lolita character, Momoko, drinks only tea and eats only sweets.

Gothic Lolita, Kuro Lolita, Shiro Lolita, and Military Lolita are all subtypes, also, in the US Anime Convention scene Casual Lolita.

==== Decora ====
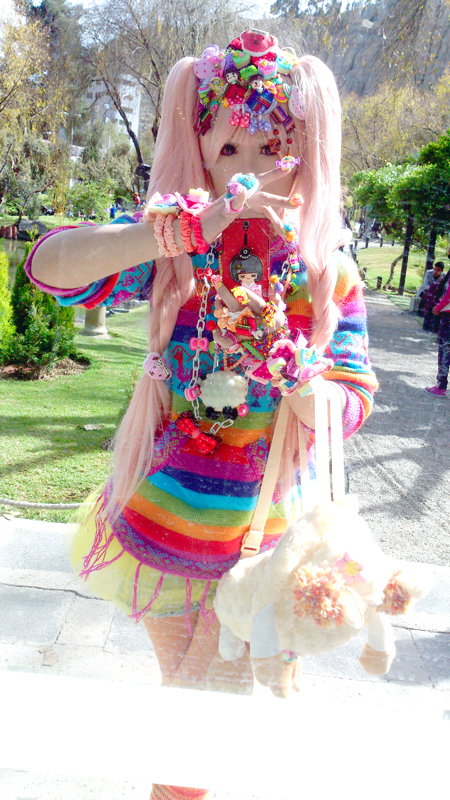
Example of Decora fashion

Decora is a style that is characterized by wearing many "decorations" on oneself. It is considered to be self-decoration. The goal of this fashion is to become as vibrant and characterized as possible. People who take part in this fashion trend wear accessories such as multicolor hair pins, bracelets, rings, necklaces, etc. By adding multiple layers of accessories to an outfit, the fashion trend tends to have a childlike appearance. Some individuals may find the exaggerated childlike elements of the kawaii aesthetic to be off-putting or inauthentic. Others, however, appreciate the positivity, innocence, and lightheartedness associated with the kawaii style. It also includes toys and multicolor clothes. Decora and Fairy Kei have some crossover.

==== Fairy Kei ====
Fairy Kei is a youthful style based on 1980s fashion that evokes a dreamy, nostalgic feeling. Outfits are made up of pastel colors, angels, toys and generally cute motifs and elements and accessories from Western toy lines of the 1980s and early 1990s, such as Polly Pocket, My Little Pony, Strawberry Shortcake, Rainbow Brite, Popples, Lady Lovely Locks, Barbie, Wuzzles, and Care Bears. Pastel-colored hair is common, although natural hair is also popular, and hairstyles are usually kept simple and decorated with anything cute or pastel; bows are a common theme. Some common items used in a Fairy Kei coordinate include vintage sweaters, cardigans, varsity jackets, tutus, mini skirts, tights, over-the-knee socks, sneakers, and tea party shoes. The term "Fairy Kei" originated from the magazine called Zipper (despite a common belief that Sayuri Tabuchi [Tavuchi], the owner of Tokyo fashion store Spank!, was the accidental creator of the style).

==== Kimo-kawaii and yami-kawaii ====
Kimo-kawaii, also known as "creepy-cute" or "gross-cute" in Japanese, is a unique look that combines kawaii aesthetics with stylistic elements of horror and the macabre. The style emerged in the 1990s when some people lost interest in cute and innocent characters and fashion. It is usually achieved by wearing creepy or gross clothes or accessories, with a stronger emphasis on dark themes and colors. Yami-kawaii, or "sickly-cute", emerged in the mid-2010s to emphasize themes of mental health, vulnerability, and emotional darkness through fashion. In contrast to kimo-kawaii, the style uses black, deep purple, and gray colors on teardrops, broken hearts, pill capsules, and other melancholic motifs.

==== Kawaii men ====
Although typically a female-dominated fashion, some men partake in the kawaii trend. Men wearing masculine kawaii accessories is very uncommon, and typically the men cross-dress as kawaii women instead by wearing wigs, false eyelashes, applying makeup, and wearing kawaii female clothing. This is seen predominately in male entertainers, such as Torideta-san, a DJ who transforms himself into a kawaii woman when working at his nightclub.

Japanese pop stars and actors often have longer hair, such as Takuya Kimura of SMAP. Men are also noted as often aspiring to a neotenic look.

=== Products ===
The concept of kawaii has had an influence on a variety of products, including candy, such as Hi-Chew, Koala's March, and Hello Panda. Cuteness can be added to products by adding cute features, such as hearts, flowers, stars, and rainbows. Cute elements can be found almost everywhere in Japan, from big business to corner markets and national government, ward, and town offices. Many companies, large and small, use cute mascots to present their wares and services to the public. For example:

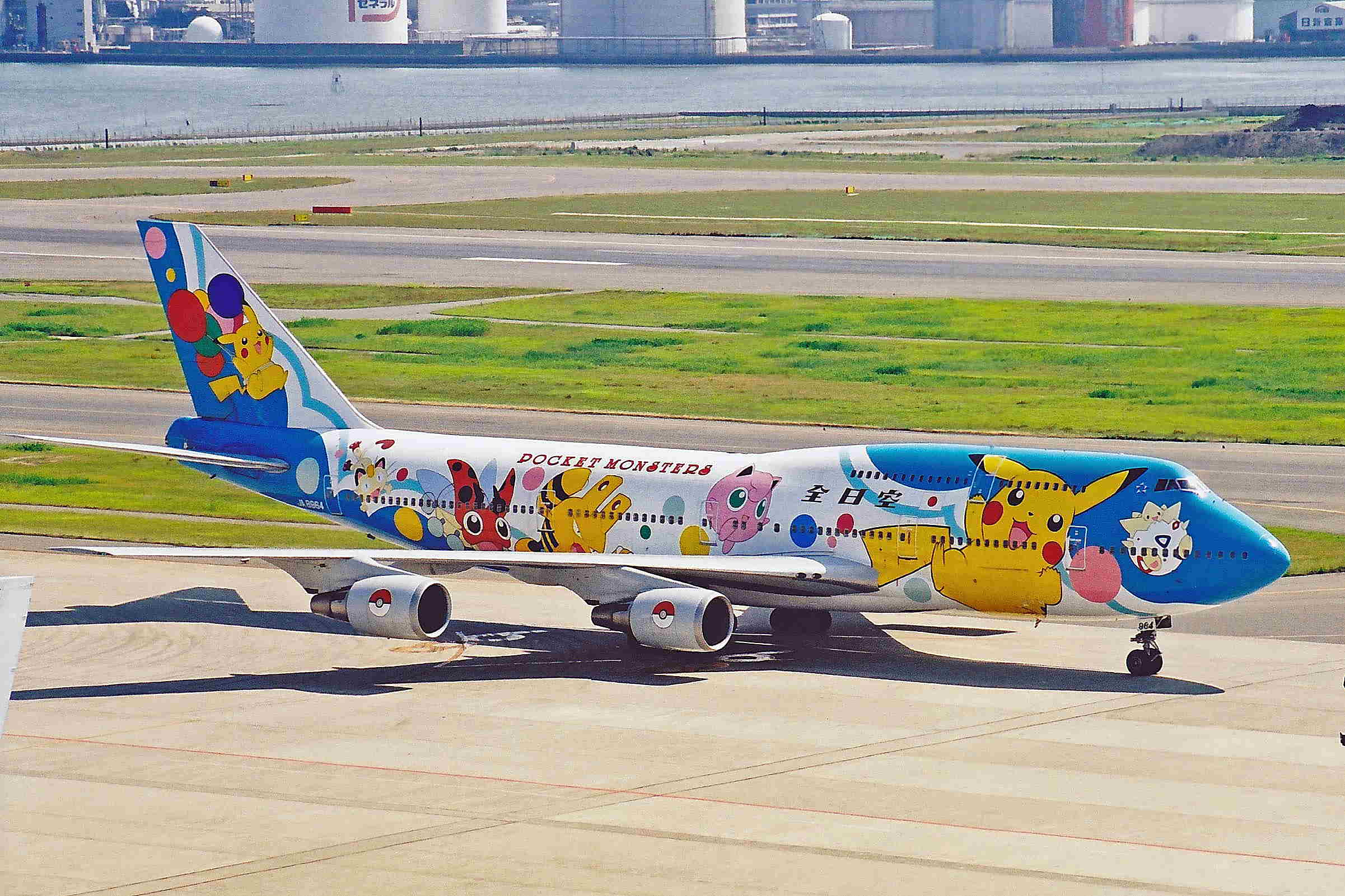
All Nippon Airways Boeing 747 with a Pokémon livery

- Pikachu, a character from Pokémon, adorns the side of ten ANA passenger jets, the Pokémon Jets.
- Asahi Bank used Miffy (Nijntje), a character from a Dutch series of children's picture books, on some of its ATM and credit cards.
- The prefectures of Japan, as well as many cities and cultural institutions, have cute mascot characters known as yuru-chara to promote tourism. Kumamon, the Kumamoto Prefecture mascot, and Hikonyan, the city of Hikone mascot, are among the most popular.
- The Japan Post "Yū-Pack" mascot is a stylized mailbox; they also use other cute mascot characters to promote their various services (among them the Postal Savings Bank) and have used many such on postage stamps.
- Some police forces in Japan have their own moe mascots, which sometimes adorn the front of kōban (police boxes).
- NHK, the public broadcaster, has its own cute mascots. Domokun, the unique-looking and widely recognized NHK mascot, was introduced in 1998 and quickly took on a life of its own, appearing in Internet memes and fan art around the world.
- Sanrio, the company behind Hello Kitty and other similarly cute characters, runs the Sanrio Puroland theme park in Tokyo, and painted on some EVA Air Airbus A330 jets as well. Sanrio's line of more than 50 characters takes in more than $1 billion a year, and it remains the most successful company to capitalize on the cute trend.
- Kawaii future bass, a subgenre of future bass.

Cute can be also used to describe a specific fashion sense of an individual, and generally includes clothing that appears to be made for young children, apart from the size, or clothing that accentuates the cuteness of the individual wearing the clothing. Ruffles and pastel colors are commonly (but not always) featured, and accessories often include toys or bags featuring anime characters.

==== Non-kawaii imports ====
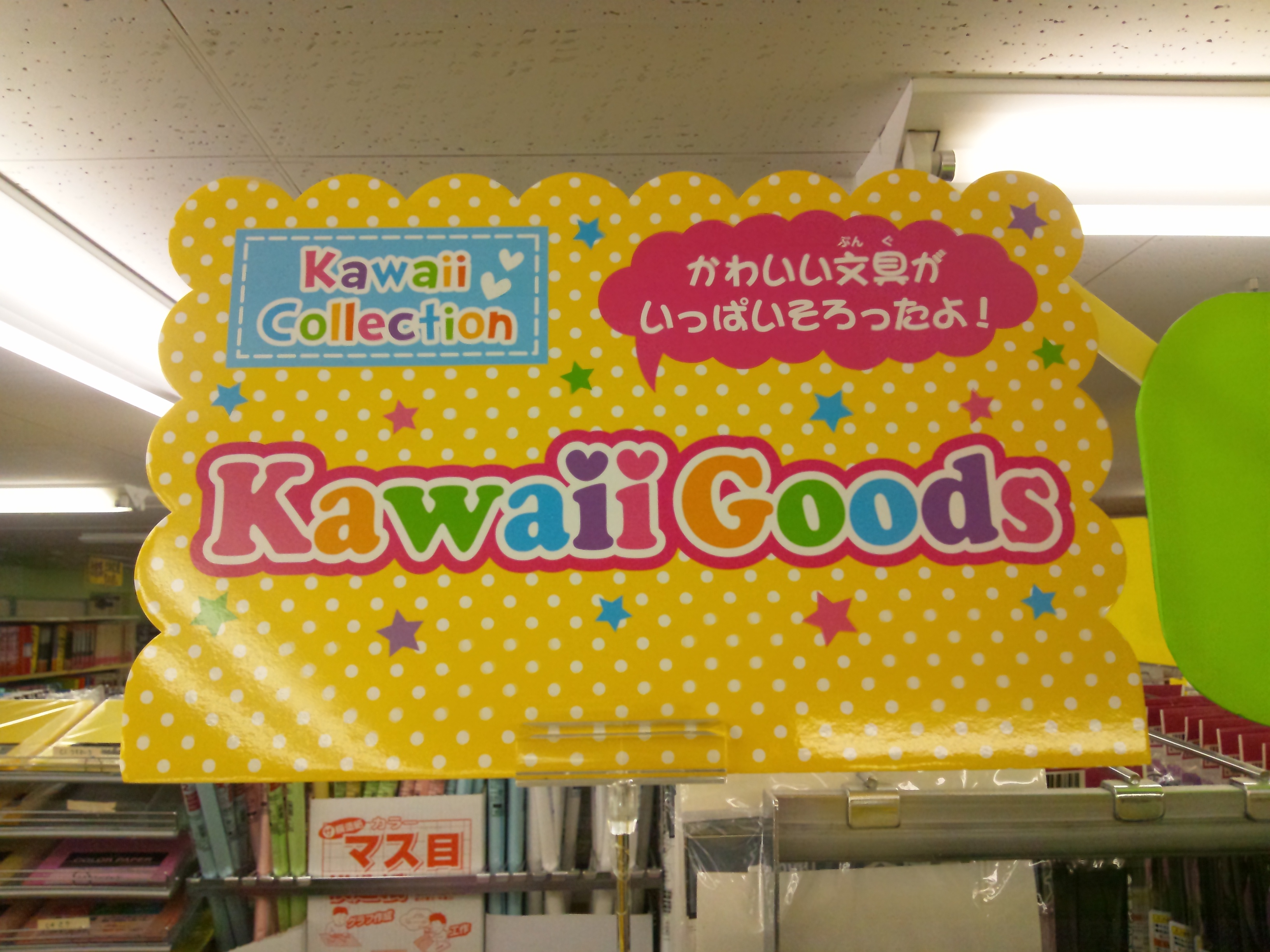
Kawaii goods outlet in 100 yen shop

There have been occasions on which popular Western products failed to meet the expectations of kawaii, and thus did not do well in the Japanese market. For example, Cabbage Patch Kids dolls did not sell well in Japan, because the Japanese considered their facial features to be "ugly" and "grotesque" compared to the flatter and almost featureless faces of characters such as Hello Kitty. Also, the doll Barbie, portraying an adult woman, did not become successful in Japan compared to Takara's Licca, a doll that was modeled after an 11-year-old girl.

==== Industry ====
Kawaii has gradually gone from a small subculture in Japan to an important part of Japanese modern culture as a whole. An overwhelming number of modern items feature kawaii themes, not only in Japan but also worldwide. Characters associated with kawaii are astoundingly popular; "global cuteness" is reflected in such billion-dollar sellers as Pokémon and Hello Kitty. "Fueled by Internet subcultures, Hello Kitty alone has hundreds of entries on eBay, and is selling in more than 30 countries, including Argentina, Bahrain, and Taiwan."

Japan has become a powerhouse in the kawaii industry and images of Hello Kitty, Doraemon, Pikachu, Sailor Moon, and Hamtaro are popular in mobile phone accessories. However, Professor Tian Shenliang says that Japan's future is dependent on how much of an impact kawaii brings to humanity.

The Japanese Foreign Ministry has also recognized the power of cute merchandise and sent three 18-year-old women overseas in 2018 in the hopes of spreading Japanese culture around the world. The women dress in uniforms and maid costumes that are commonplace in Japan.

Kawaii manga and magazines have brought tremendous profit to the Japanese press industry. Moreover, the worldwide revenue from the computer game and its merchandising peripherals are closing in on $5 billion, according to a Nintendo press release titled "It's a Pokémon Planet".

== Impact upon other cultures ==
Kawaii products have become especially popular in other parts of East Asia, such as mainland China, Hong Kong, Macau, Taiwan, and South Korea, as well as Southeast Asian countries including the Philippines, Singapore, Thailand, and Vietnam. In recent years, their popularity has spread beyond the borders of Asia, among anime and manga fans as well as others influenced by Japanese culture in countries such as the United States. In 2014, the Collins English Dictionary in the United Kingdom entered kawaii into its then latest edition, defining it as a "Japanese artistic and cultural style that emphasises the quality of cuteness, using bright colours and characters with a childlike appearance."

=== In East Asia and Southeast Asia ===
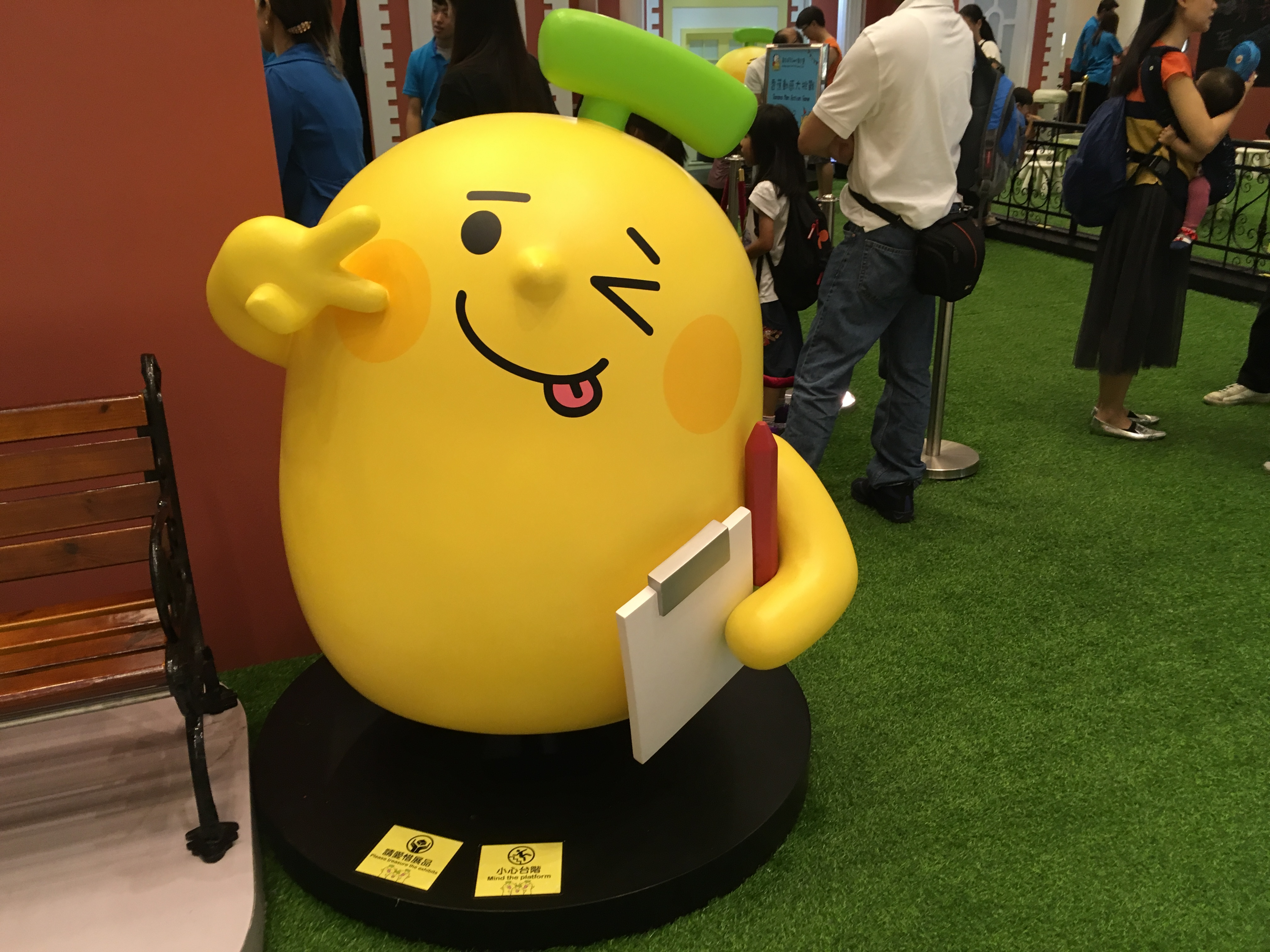
Kawaii-style mascot on display in Hong Kong

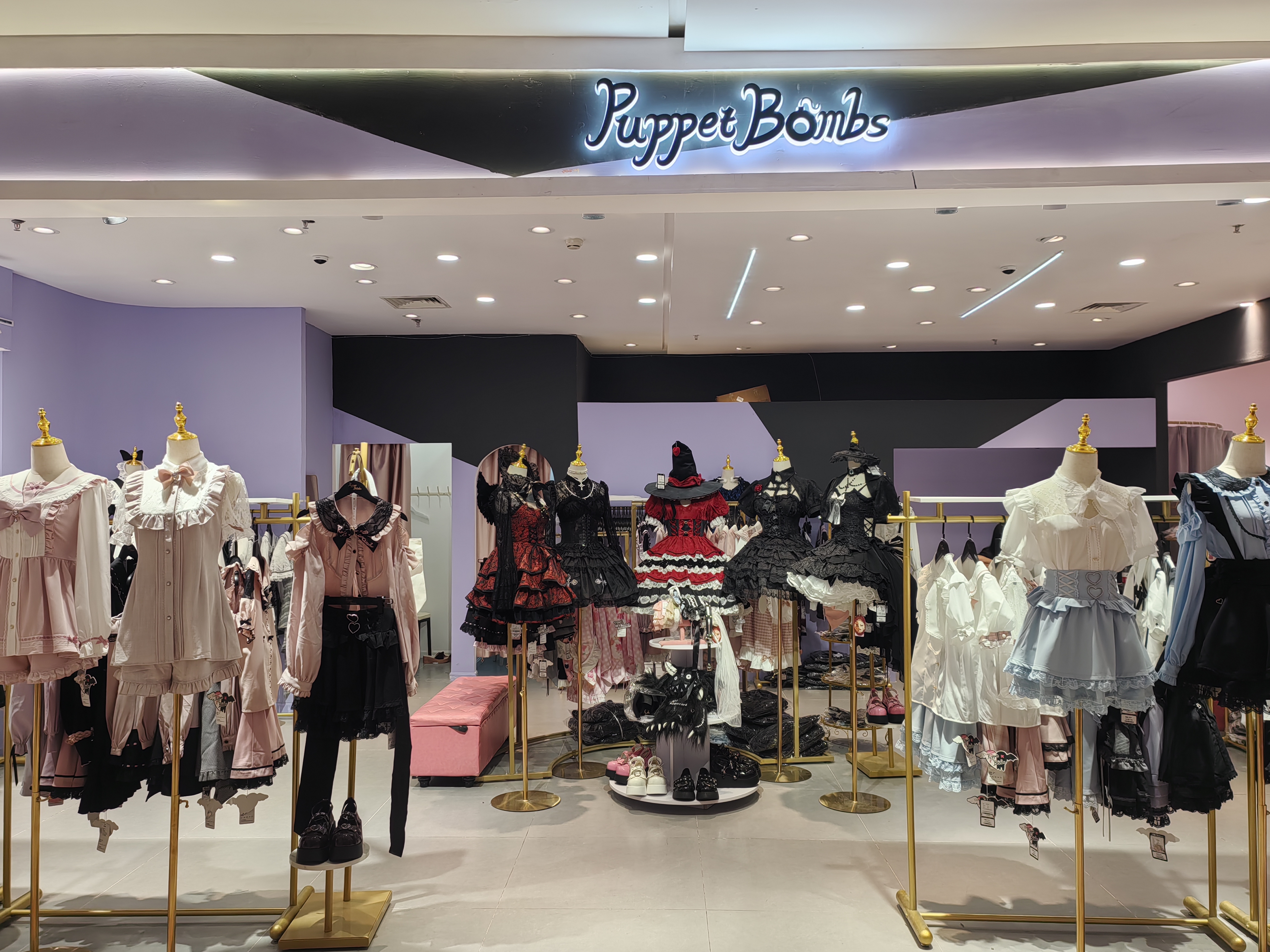
A store selling Jirai-kei-style clothing in Sichuan, China

Taiwanese culture, the government in particular, has embraced and elevated kawaii to a new level of social consciousness. The introduction of the A-Bian doll was seen as the development of a symbol to advance democracy and assist in constructing a collective imagination and national identity for Taiwanese people. The A-Bian dolls are kawaii likeness of sports figure, famous individuals, and now political figures that use kawaii images as a means of self-promotion and potential votes. The creation of the A-Bian doll has allowed Taiwanese President Chen Shui-bian staffers to create a new culture where the kawaii image of a politician can be used to mobilize support and gain election votes.

Kawaii culture has had an effect on Singaporean youth since the mid-1980s, when Japan became one of the economic powers in the world. Kawaii has developed from a few children's television shows to an Internet sensation. Japanese media is used so abundantly in Singapore that youths are more likely to imitate the fashion of their Japanese idols, learn the Japanese language, and continue purchasing Japanese oriented merchandise.

=== Globally ===
Japanese kawaii seemingly operates as a center of global popularity due to its association with making cultural productions and consumer products "cute". This mindset pursues a global market, giving rise to numerous applications and interpretations in other cultures. The wide popularity of Japanese kawaii is often credited with it being "culturally odorless". The elimination of exoticism and national branding has helped kawaii to reach numerous target audiences and span every culture, class, and gender group. The palatable characteristics of kawaii have made it a global hit, resulting in Japan's global image shifting from being known for austere rock gardens to being known for "cute-worship".

Sebastian Masuda, owner of 6%DOKIDOKI and a global advocate for kawaii style, takes the quality from Harajuku to Western markets in his stores and artwork. The underlying belief of this Japanese designer is that kawaii actually saves the world. The infusion of kawaii into other world markets and cultures is achieved by introducing kawaii via modern art; audio, visual, and written media; and the fashion trends of Japanese youth, especially in high school girls.

The dissemination of Japanese youth fashion and kawaii culture is usually associated with the Western society and trends set by designers borrowed or taken from Japan. However, with the emergence of China, South Korea and Singapore as global economic centers, the kawaii merchandise and product popularity has shifted back to the East.

== Criticism ==
=== Academic social critiques ===
In his book The Power of Cute, philosophy professor Simon May talks about the 180 degree turn in Japan's history, from the violence of war to kawaii starting around the 1970s, in the works of artists like Takashi Murakami, amongst others. By 1992, kawaii was seen as "the most widely used, widely loved, habitual word in modern living Japanese." Since then, there has been some criticism surrounding kawaii and the expectations of it in Japanese culture. Natalia Konstantinovskaia, in her article "Being Kawaii in Japan", says that based on the increasing ratio of young Japanese girls that view themselves as kawaii, there is a possibility that "from early childhood, Japanese people are socialized into the expectation that women must be kawaii." The idea of kawaii can be tricky to balance – if a woman's interpretation of kawaii seems to have gone too far, she is then labeled as burikko, "a woman who plays bogus innocence." In the article "Embodied Kawaii: Girls' voices in J-pop", contemporary music researchers argue that female J-pop singers are expected to be recognizable by their outfits, voice, and mannerisms as kawaii – young and cute. Any woman who becomes a J-pop icon must stay kawaii, or keep her girlishness, rather than being perceived as a woman, even if she is over 18.

=== Superficial charm ===
Japanese women who feign kawaii behaviors (e.g., high-pitched voice, squealing giggles) that could be viewed as forced or inauthentic are called burikko, which is often considered superficial charm. The neologism developed in the 1980s, perhaps originated by comedian Kuniko Yamada (山田邦子, Yamada Kuniko).

== See also ==
- Aegyo
- Burikko
- Chibi (style)
- Cute Girls Doing Cute Things
- Ingénue
- Kawaii metal
- Moe (slang)
- Nekonomics
- Yuru-chara
