= List of Gambling Apocalypse: Kaiji chapters =

First tankōbon volume cover of Gambling Apocalypse: Kaiji

Gambling Apocalypse: Kaiji, known in Japan as Tobaku Mokushiroku Kaiji, is the first part of the manga series Kaiji by Nobuyuki Fukumoto. It ran in Kodansha's seinen manga magazine Weekly Young Magazine from 1996 to 1999. Kodansha collected its chapters in thirteen tankōbon volumes, released from September 6, 1996, to October 6, 1999. It was followed by the second part, Tobaku Hakairoku Kaiji. Gambling Apocalypse: Kaiji was adapted by Madhouse into an anime television series, Kaiji: Ultimate Survivor, which was broadcast from 2007 to 2008.

In August 2018, it was announced at Otakon that the then brand new North American manga publishing company Denpa licensed the first part. It is being released in a six-volume omnibus edition with 500+ pages in each one, and the first volume was published on December 10, 2019. In June 2020, Manga Planet announced the digital English-language publication of the series. It was planned to start on June 23, 2020; however, it was postponed to November 18, 2020.

== Volumes ==
No.	Release date	ISBN
01	September 6, 1996	978-4-06-336608-2
1. "Hope" (希望, Kibō); 2. "A Crossroads" (岐路, Kiro); 3. "Pitch Black" (漆黒, Shikkoku); 4. "Setting Sail" (出航, Shukkō); 5. "Playtime" (遊戯, Yūgi); 6. "Transformation" (変貌, Henbō); 7. "The Games Begin" (火蓋, Hibuta); 8. "Dirty Tricks" (裏技, Urawaza); 9. "Desperation" (絶命, Zetsumei); 10. "Alliance" (共闘, Kyōtō); 11. "Treason" (謀反, Muhon)
02	October 4, 1996	978-4-06-336623-5
12. "Suspense" (焦燥, Shōsō); 13. "Secret Maneuvers" (秘策, Hisaku); 14. "The Match" (勝負, Shōbu); 15. "Rampage" (凶行, Kyōkō); 16. "Blind Spot" (盲点, Mōten); 17. "A Reprieve" (救済, Kyūsai); 18. "Catastrophe" (激震, Gekishin); 19. "Monopoly" (独占, Dokusen); 20. "Speculators" (仕手, Shite); 21. "Panic" (恐慌, Kyōkō); 22. "Doom" (破綻, Hatan); 23. "Bitter Defeat" (惨敗, Sanpai)
03	December 6, 1996	978-4-06-336640-2
24. "Catalyst" (誘発, Yūhatsu); 25. "The Surge" (開戦, Kaisen); 26. "Ready To Die" (決死, Kesshi); 27. "Provocation" (煽動, Sendō); 28. "Capture" (拿捕, Daho); 29. "Fault" (欠陥, Kekkan); 30. "Harvest Time" (豊凶, Hōkyō); 31. "Pushing Forward" (邁進, Maishin); 32. "Hegemony" (覇道, Hadō); 33. "Favorable Wind" (順風, Junpū); 34. "Contempt" (唾棄, Daki); 35. "Ups and Downs" (興亡, Kōbō)
04	April 4, 1997	978-4-06-336659-4
36. "Deposition" (沈殿, Chinden); 37. "Irrationality" (背理, Hairi); 38. "Zilch" (水泡, Suihō); 39. "Survival of the Fittest" (弱肉, Jakuniku); 40. "Revelation" (暴露, Bakuro); 41. "Proclamation" (喝破, Kappa); 42. "Curse" (呪縛, Shubaku); 43. "Preparedness" (覚悟, Kakugo); 44. "Frontal Attack" (正攻, Seikō); 45. "Target" (標的, Hyōteki); 46. "Volunteer" (挺身, Teishin); 47. "Crushing Blow" (鉄槌, Tettsui)
05	July 4, 1997	978-4-06-336674-7
48. "Seal" (封印, Fūin); 49. "Speechless" (絶句, Zekku); 50. "Extinction" (断絶, Danzetsu); 51. "Corrosion" (腐蝕, Fushoku); 52. "Sneer" (嘲笑, Chōshō); 53. "Resurrection" (回生, Kaisei); 54. "Dawn" (曙光, Shokō); 55. "Suspicion" (嫌疑, Kengi); 56. "Emissary" (使者, Shisha); 57. "Shameful" (忸怩, Jikuji); 58. "Concentration" (結集, Kenshū)
06	December 5, 1997	978-4-06-336709-6
59. "Confined Place" (閉所, Heisho); 60. "Hopelessness" (絶望, Zetsubō); 61. "First Step" (初歩, Shoho); 62. "Tumbling Down" (転落, Tenraku); 63. "Feeding Frenzy" (狂宴, Kyōen); 64. "Attack" (襲撃, Shōgeki); 65. "Shedding Tears" (落涙, Rakurui); 66. "Declaration" (宣言, Sengen); 67. "Reckless" (無謀, Mubō); 68. "Blackout Curtain" (暗幕, Anmaku); 69. "Promise" (約束, Yakusoku); 70. "Spur" (拍車, Hakusha)
07	March 6, 1998	978-4-06-336726-3
71. "Blood Replenishment" (補血, Hoketsu); 72. "Demonstration" (表明, Hyōmei); 73. "Preference" (嗜好, Shikō); 74. "Spirit" (意気, Iki); 75. "Depths" (深層, Shinsō); 76. "Flight" (飛翔, Hishō); 77. "The Beast" (怪物, Kaibutsu); 78. "Fuse" (導火, Dōka); 79. "Chain Reaction" (連鎖, Rensa); 80. "Intensification" (激化, Gekika); 81. "Destruction" (死滅, Shimetsu); 82. "Regeneration" (再生, Saisei)
08	July 6, 1998	978-4-06-336745-4
83. "Testament" (遺言, Yuigon); 84. "Lamentation" (慟哭, Dōkoku); 85. "Apparition" (亡霊, Bōrei); 86. "Isolation" (孤立, Koritsu); 87. "Aspiration" (希望, Kibō); 88. "Sorcery" (魔道, Madō); 89. "Firmament" (天空, Tenkū); 90. "Dead Space" (死角, Shikaku); 91. "At the Castle" (登城, Tojō); 92. "Audience" (謁見, Ekken); 93. "Mastermind" (黒幕, Kuromaku); 94. "Emperor" (皇帝, Kōtei)
09	October 6, 1998	978-4-06-336762-1
95. "Establishment" (設定, Settei); 96. "Device" (装置, Sōchi); 97. "Furious" (怒髪, Dohatsu); 98. "Just Punishment" (天誅, Tenchū); 99. "Opening of Hostilities" (戦端, Sentan); 100. "Wartime Fire" (戦火, Senka); 101. "Music to the Ear" (蛩音, Kyōon); 102. "Avici" (無間, Mugen); 103. "Adversity" (逆境, Gyakkyō); 104. "Fever Pitch" (発熱, Hatsunetsu); 105. "Conversation" (会話, Kaiwa); 106. "Flash of Light" (閃光, Senkō)
10	January 7, 1999	978-4-06-336776-8
107. "Pursuit" (追撃, Tsuigeki); 108. "Iron Wall" (鉄壁, Teppeki); 109. "Bloodshed" (流血, Ryūketsu); 110. "Toyed With" (翻弄, Honrō); 111. "Mire" (泥濘, Nukarumi); 112. "Chaos" (混沌, Konton); 113. "Physical Disorder" (違和, Iwa); 114. "Discovery" (発覚, Hakkaku); 115. "Truth" (真実, Shinjitsu); 116. "Blasphemy" (冒瀆, Bōtoku); 117. "Boundaries" (限界, Genkai); 118. "Decision" (決断, Ketsudan)
11	June 4, 1999	978-4-06-336804-8
119. "Resolve" (覚悟, Kakugo); 120. "Suppression" (封殺, Fūsatsu); 121. "Demise" (終焉, Shūen); 122. "Fierce God" (鬼神, Kishin); 123. "Tumbler" (不倒, Futō); 124. "Speculation" (思惟, Shii); 125. "Deception" (欺瞞, Giman); 126. "Calling Off" (破算, Hasan); 127. "Body and Soul" (心血, Shinketsu); 128. "Thick and Thin" (嘗胆, Shōtan); 129. "Recollection" (追憶, Tsuioku); 130. "Complete Devotion" (全霊, Zenrei)
12	September 6, 1999	978-4-06-336825-3
131. "Deadlock" (停止, Teishi); 132. "Evasion" (回避, Kaihi); 133. "Extermination" (撃滅, Gekimetsu); 134. "Cause of Victory" (勝因, Shōin); 135. "Apology" (謝罪, Shazai); 136. "Execution" (執行, Shikkō); 137. "Scorching Heat" (灼熱, Shakunetsu); 138. "Dejected" (憮然, Buzen); 139. "Framework" (構造, Kōzō); 140. "Speaking Out" (披瀝, Hireki); 141. "Unorthodox" (邪道, Jadō); 142. "Drawing the Sword" (抜剣, Bakken); 143. "Direct Petition" (強訴, Gōso); 144. "Logic" (筋道, Sujimichi)
13	October 6, 1999	978-4-06-336832-1
145. "Enticement" (誘引, Yūin); 146. "Conditions" (条件, Jōken); 147. "Proposal" (提案, Teian); 148. "Consent" (首肯, Shukō); 149. "Investment" (投入, Tōnyū); 150. "Good Luck" (強運, Kyōun); 151. "Aghast" (蒼白, Sōhaku); 152. "Dissipation" (散逸, Sanitsu); 153. "Fate" (運気, Unki); 154. "Terror" (恐恐, Kowagowa); 155. "Real Motive" (本意, Hon'i); 156. "Afterglow" (残光, Zankō); 157. "Unrewarded" (無冠, Mukan); 158. "Tomorrow" (明日, Ashita)

== Omnibus edition ==
No.	Title	Original release date	English release date
1	Survival of the Fittest; Jakunikukyōshoku-hen (弱肉強食編)	September 24, 2003 (1st edition); April 6, 2016 (2nd edition); July 18, 2018 (3rd edition); 978-4-06-353113-8 (1st edition); 978-4-06-385895-2 (2nd edition); 978-4-06-512909-8 (3rd edition)	December 10, 2019; 978-1-63442-924-5
2	Machiavellianism; Kenbōjussū-hen (権謀術数編)	September 24, 2003 (1st edition); April 20, 2016 (2nd edition); August 29, 2018 (3rd edition); 978-4-06-353114-5 (1st edition); 978-4-06-385896-9 (2nd edition); 978-4-06-512910-4 (3rd edition)	November 24, 2020; 978-1-63442-926-9
3	Human Derby; Ningen Keiba-hen (人間競馬編)	November 5, 2003 (1st edition); May 11, 2016 (2nd edition); September 12, 2018 (3rd edition); 978-4-06-353123-7 (1st edition); 978-4-06-385897-6 (2nd edition); 978-4-06-512911-1 (3rd edition)	December 14, 2021; 978-1-63442-928-3
4	Multistoried Funambulism; Kōsō Tsunawatari-hen (高層綱渡り編)	November 26, 2003 (1st edition); May 25, 2016 (2nd edition); September 26, 2018 (3rd edition); 978-4-06-353124-4 (1st edition); 978-4-06-385898-3 (2nd edition); 978-4-06-512912-8 (3rd edition)	May 23, 2023; 978-1-63442-930-6
5	Invincible Emperor; Jōshō Kōtei-hen (常勝皇帝編)	December 10, 2003 (1st edition); June 8, 2016 (2nd edition); October 10, 2018 (3rd edition); 978-4-06-353135-0 (1st edition); 978-4-06-385908-9 (2nd edition); 978-4-06-512913-5 (3rd edition)	August 27, 2024; 978-1-63442-932-0
6	Counterattacking Slave; Gyakushū Dorei-hen (逆襲奴隷編)	December 19, 2003 (1st edition); June 22, 2016 (2nd edition); October 24, 2018 (3rd edition); 978-4-06-353136-7 (1st edition); 978-4-06-385912-6 (2nd edition); 978-4-06-512914-2 (3rd edition)	April 27, 2027; 978-1-63442-934-4
