= List of Tobaku Datenroku Kaiji: One Poker-hen chapters =

First tankōbon volume cover of Tobaku Datenroku Kaiji: One Poker-hen

Tobaku Datenroku Kaiji: One Poker-hen is the fifth part of the manga series Kaiji by Nobuyuki Fukumoto. It ran in Kodansha's seinen manga magazine Weekly Young Magazine from 2013 to 2017. Kodansha collected its chapters in sixteen tankōbon volumes, released from November 6, 2013, to January 5, 2018. It was followed by the sixth part, Tobaku Datenroku Kaiji: 24 Oku Dasshutsu-hen.

== Volumes ==
| No. | Release date | ISBN |
|---|---|---|
| 01 (50) | November 6, 2013 | 978-4-06-382358-5 |
101. "Two Cards" (2枚, 2-Mai); 102. "Review" (確認, Kakunin); 103. "Life" (人生, Jinsei); 104. "Very Lucky" (強運, Kyōun); 105. "Illness" (病気, Byōki); 106. "Sitting Down" (着席, Chakuseki); 107. "Resolute" (決然, Ketsuzen); 108. "First Match" (初戦, Shosen); 109. "Shame" (慙愧, Zanki); 110. "Apprehension" (疑心, Gishin)
| 02 (51) | December 20, 2013 | 978-4-06-382390-5 |
111. "Callous" (非情, Hijō); 112. "Laxity" (緩怠, Kantai); 113. "See Through" (看破, Kanpa); 114. "Fierce Attack" (猛攻, Mōkō); 115. "Intimidation" (恫喝, Dōkatsu); 116. "Gambling Talent" (博才, Bakusai); 117. "Suspension" (浮遊, Fuyū); 118. "Superiority" (優位, Yūi); 119. "Abrupt" (不意, Fui); 120. "Counterattack" (逆襲, Gyakushū)
| 03 (52) | May 2, 2014 | 978-4-06-382469-8 |
121. "Bewilderment" (惑乱, Wakuran); 122. "Transfiguration" (変貌, Henbō); 123. "Bad Dream" (悪夢, Akumu); 124. "Agony" (煩悶, Hanmon); 125. "Conservatism" (保守, Hoshu); 126. "Conflict" (齟齬, Sogo); 127. "Hesitation" (逡巡, Shunjun); 128. "Bitterness" (苦渋, Kujū); 129. "Servitude" (隷属, Reizoku); 130. "Powerlessness" (無力, Muryoku)
| 04 (53) | September 5, 2014 | 978-4-06-382523-7 |
131. "Seeing" (見参, Kenzan); 132. "Comeback" (再起, Saiki); 133. "Epiphany" (降臨, Kōrin); 134. "Diversion" (陽動, Yōdō); 135. "Noh Mask" (能面, Nōmen); 136. "Resolute" (果断, Kadan); 137. "Conclusion" (結末, Ketsumatsu); 138. "Decision" (決着, Kecchaku); 139. "Temptation" (誘惑, Yūwaku); 140. "Impulsive" (無謀, Mubō)
| 05 (54) | December 5, 2014 | 978-4-06-382540-4 |
141. "Mercy" (慈悲, Jihi); 142. "Withdrawal" (退出, Taishutsu); 143. "Sympathy" (同情, Dōjō); 144. "Torch" (灯火, Tōka); 145. "Suspicion" (疑念, Ginen); 146. "Thrice" (三度, Sando); 147. "Deceased Spirit" (御霊, Mitama); 148. "Strong Argument" (極論, Kyokuron); 149. "Tank" (戦車, Sensha); 150. "Assistance" (応援, Ōen)
| 06 (55) | March 6, 2015 | 978-4-06-382581-7 |
151. "Deviation" (逸脱, Itsudatsu); 152. "Revolution" (回転, Kaiten); 153. "Incarnation" (化身, Keshin); 154. "Extraordinary" (破格, Hakaku); 155. "Gratitude" (感謝, Kansha); 156. "Envy" (羨望, Senbō); 157. "Fate" (命運, Meiun); 158. "Counteroffensive" (反撃, Hangeki); 159. "Sure Thing" (鉄板, Teppan); 160. "Pain" (疼痛, Tōtsū)
| 07 (56) | June 5, 2015 | 978-4-06-382615-9 |
161. "Interception" (遮断, Shadan); 162. "White Hot" (灼熱, Shakunetsu); 163. "Leap" (跳躍, Chōyaku); 164. "Missing a Chance" (逸機, Ikki); 165. "Resignation" (覚悟, Kakugo); 166. "Intoxication" (陶酔, Tōsui); 167. "Swaying" (揺蕩, Yōtō); 168. "Surprise" (意表, Ihyō); 169. "Consecutive" (連続, Renzoku)
| 08 (57) | September 4, 2015 | 978-4-06-382676-0 |
170. "Avoidance" (回避, Kaihi); 171. "Ground Level" (地平, Chihei); 172. "On the Way" (途中, Tochū); 173. "Guts" (気概, Kigai); 174. "Spider" (蜘蛛, Kumo); 175. "Backfire" (裏目, Urame); 176. "Regret" (後悔, Kōkai); 177. "Curse" (呪縛, Jubaku); 178. "Determination" (決意, Ketsui)
| 09 (58) | December 4, 2015 | 978-4-06-382720-0 |
179. "Skepticism" (懐疑, Kaigi); 180. "Conjecture" (推察, Suisatsu); 181. "Pressure" (重圧, Jūatsu); 182. "Blunder" (失錯, Shissaku); 183. "Hasty" (臆断, Okudan); 184. "Sending In" (出動, Shutsudō); 185. "Provocation" (挑発, Chōhatsu); 186. "Bewilderment" (当惑, Tōwaku); 187. "Anguish" (苦悶, Kumon)
| 10 (59) | March 4, 2016 | 978-4-06-382747-7 |
188. "Crash" (衝撃, Shōgeki); 189. "Other Side" (裏側, Uragawa); 190. "Embodiment" (具現, Gugen); 191. "Miscalculation" (誤算, Gosan); 192. "Camouflage" (擬態, Gitai); 193. "Revelation" (啓示, Keiji); 194. "Resolution" (英断, Eidan); 195. "Self-Mockery" (自嘲, Jichō); 196. "Side-by-Side" (並走, Heisō); 197. "Sense" (察知, Sacchi)
| 11 (60) | June 6, 2016 | 978-4-06-382803-0 |
198. "Amazement" (喫驚, Bikkuri); 199. "Speaking Out" (吐露, Toro); 200. "Compromise" (譲歩, Jōho); 201. "Dark Clouds" (暗雲, An'un); 202. "Turning Point" (潮目, Shiome); 203. "Inner Heart" (心奥, Shin'ō); 204. "Bright Light" (光明, Kōmyō); 205. "Scheme" (策略, Sakuryaku); 206. "Memory" (記憶, Kioku); 207. "Striking Home" (的中, Tekichū)
| 12 (61) | October 6, 2016 | 978-4-06-382865-8 |
208. "Large Fish" (大魚, Taigyo); 209. "Unforeseen" (不測, Fusoku); 210. "Choice" (選択, Sentaku); 211. "Business" (営為, Eii); 212. "Turning" (旋回, Senkai); 213. "Transition" (変転, Henten); 214. "Appearance" (出現, Shutsugen); 215. "Projection" (突起, Tokki); 216. "Discovery" (発見, Hakken); 217. "Taboo" (禁忌, Kinki)
| 13 (62) | September 6, 2017 | 978-4-06-382906-8 |
218. "Melee" (乱戦, Ransen); 219. "Rivalry" (拮抗, Kikkō); 220. "Ignited" (着火, Chakka); 221. "Poison" (毒薬, Dokuyaku); 222. "Casting Away" (一擲, Itteki); 223. "Rampage" (暴走, Bōsō); 224. "Rushing Ahead" (猛進, Mōshin); 225. "Game" (遊戯, Yūgi); 226. "Rift" (亀裂, Kiretsu); 227. "Demand" (要求, Yōkyū)
| 14 (63) | September 6, 2017 | 978-4-06-510149-0 |
228. "Perspective" (次元, Jigen); 229. "Multiple Choice" (択一, Takuitsu); 230. "Breaking In" (突入, Totsunyū); 231. "Transcendence" (超越, Chōetsu); 232. "Resolution" (決心, Kesshin); 233. "Decisive Battle" (決戦, Kessen); 234. "Understanding" (了知, Ryōchi); 235. "Exception" (特例, Tokurei); 236. "Awareness" (意識, Ishiki); 237. "Risking a Life" (捨身, Shashin)
| 15 (64) | November 6, 2017 | 978-4-06-510427-9 |
238. "Switchover" (転換, Tenkan); 239. "Disgrace" (屈辱, Kutsujoku); 240. "Sacrilege" (冒瀆, Bōtoku); 241. "Announcement" (宣言, Sengen); 242. "On the Inside" (本心, Honshin); 243. "Demonstration" (表明, Hyōmei); 244. "Establishment" (成立, Seiritsu); 245. "Battle Crisis" (先途, Sendo); 246. "Outcome" (勝敗, Shōhai)
| 16 (65) | January 5, 2018 | 978-4-06-510564-1 |
247. "Fulfillment" (履行, Rikō); 248. "Flood of Tears" (滂沱, Bōda); 249. "Predicament" (窮地, Kyūchi); 250. "Entrustment" (依託, Itaku); 251. "On the Gallows" (俎上, Sojō); 252. "Rescue" (救出, Kyūshutsu); 253. "Merciful Mother" (慈母, Jibo); 254. "Crash" (激突, Gekitotsu); 255. "Drop" (落下, Rakka)
