= Kaiji: Against All Rules =

- First DVD box set cover
- No. of episodes: 26

Release
- Original network: Nippon TV
- Original release: April 6 – September 28, 2011

Season chronology
- ← Previous; Kaiji: Ultimate Survivor

Kaiji: Against All Rules is Japanese anime television series, based on Tobaku Hakairoku Kaiji, the second part of the manga series Kaiji, written and illustrated by Nobuyuki Fukumoto. Produced by Nippon Television, VAP and Madhouse, the series was directed by Yuzo Sato, with Hideo Takayashiki handling series composition, Haruhito Takada designing the characters and Hideki Taniuchi composing the music.

The series was announced by Kodansha's Weekly Young Magazine in 2011. It was broadcast on Nippon TV from April 6 to September 28, 2011. (Note: Nippon TV listed the air dates for Kaiji: Against All Rules on Tuesday at 24:59, which is effectively Wednesday at 0:59 a.m. JST.) Its 26 episodes were collected into nine DVDs, released by VAP between June 22, 2011, and February 22, 2012. VAP also re-released all the episodes on two DVD box sets on September 21, 2011, and February 22, 2012. The opening theme is "Chase the Light!" by Fear, and Loathing in Las Vegas and the ending theme is "C kara hajimaru ABC" (CからはじまるABC; "ABCs That Start From C") by Wasureranneyo.

In July 2013, Crunchyroll announced the streaming rights to the series. In November 2020, Sentai Filmworks announced that they have licensed the series for streaming on select digital outlets and home video release. It was released in Japanese with English subtitles on Blu-ray Disc on April 20, 2021.

== Episodes ==
No. overall	No. in season	Title	Directed by	Written by	Storyboarded by	Original release date
27	1	"Underground Hell"; Transliteration: "Chi no Goku" (Japanese: 地の獄)	Yuzo Sato	Hideo Takayashiki	Yuzo Sato	April 6, 2011
Months after the Starside Hotel event, Kaiji meets Endō again, and asks him for an opportunity to gamble. Endō kidnaps Kaiji and forces him into manual labor, constructing an underground nuclear fallout shelter for the Teiai Group for 15 years to pay his debt of ¥9,500,000 (around US$92,600). He is paid in perica, only making ¥350 (US$3.41) a day. He makes a plan to save up 500,000 perica in half a year, to buy a one-day outside pass to gamble for his debt. After depriving himself for a month to save money, Kaiji is tempted by foreman Tarō Ōtsuki to spend his money on beer and snacks after which Ōtsuki offers to loan Kaiji some money to start gambling on Underground Cee-lo.
28	2	"The Rules of the Game"; Transliteration: "Shōbu no Tessoku" (Japanese: 勝負の鉄則)	Hong Hun-pyo	Mitsutaka Hirota	Yoshiaki Kawajiri	April 13, 2011
Kaiji agrees to borrow 60,000 perica from Ōtsuki to play cee-lo, and joins the group when a game night is organized. The foreman explains that in Underground Cee-lo, there are 3 special rules, which everyone accepts. Kaiji starts playing with small bets to feel the pulse of the game, and realizes that the dealer has the best chance of a big win, but also of a big loss. However, after several games, he becomes dissatisfied with winning small bets that do not generate enough emotional response, tension or energy for him. When it is the novice Tomohiro Miyoshi's turn as dealer, Kaiji bets 3,000 perica. Kaiji loses, having to pay out double, but it fires him up to go all out to win.
29	3	"Bits of Luck"; Transliteration: "Kyōun no Kakera" (Japanese: 強運の欠片)	Kim Min-sun	Hideo Takayashiki	Yoshiaki Kawajiri	April 20, 2011
Even though Kaiji initially loses 3,000 perica, he keeps betting 3,000 multiple times during the night. After 40 minutes of gambling, he bets 5,000 perica, and has a good win. However, when it is his first turn as dealer, Ōtsuki and his cohort Kaoru Isawa both bet 20,000 perica and Kaiji accuses them of being bloodsucking leeches out to ruin him with the tacit compliance of the other players. Nevertheless, he plays on and even though he has a big win, on his second turn as dealer he loses 60,000 perica to Ōtsuki and Isawa, but he only has 40,000 perica, falling further into debt hell.
30	4	"The Beginnings of a Comeback"; Transliteration: "Gyakushū no Itoguchi" (Japanese: 逆襲の糸口)	Masaki Matsumura	Mitsutaka Hirota	Yoshiaki Kawajiri	April 27, 2011
Weeks after Kaiji lost on gambling night, Kaiji receives advance pay for the money he owes. He is in a group of 6 men called the "Forty-fivers", who are all in debt to Ōtsuki from gambling and receive only 45,000 of their 91,000 perica salaries. When Kaiji helps take a sick inmate to the clinic where they have to pay for their own medication, he realizes that he will never last 15 years. While talking to Miyoshi who has recorded every roll of the dice, Kaiji discovers that Ōtsuki has high rolls when seated between Isawa and Takuya Numakawa and realizes that he is cheating. Kaiji then convinces the Forty-fivers to pool their money and raise a large enough stake to beat Ōtsuki.
30	5	"Abuse and Endurance"; Transliteration: "Gyakutai to Nintai" (Japanese: 虐待と忍耐)	Woo Seung-wook	Hideo Takayashiki	Tomomi Fujiyama	May 4, 2011
While Kaiji is on medical duty, he meets the son of Ishida, Hiromitsu, who is also working underground for his debt, but blames his father for not bailing him out. Angrily Kaiji berates him for not accepting his own weaknesses. Later, Kaiji insults Ōtsuki who then makes life a misery for Kaiji and the Forty-fivers, but after three months they all return to full pay. Meanwhile, Yoshihiro Kurosaki, Tonegawa's replacement, observes Kaiji through CCTV. When the gambling night begins, Kaiji proposes no betting limit before he will join in and Ōtsuki accepts.
31	6	"The Storm Descends"; Transliteration: "Neppū no Tōrai" (Japanese: 熱風の到来)	Kenichi Kawamura	Mitsutaka Hirota	Kenichi Kawamura	May 11, 2011
Kaiji and Ōtsuki prepare to face each other over cee-lo, each thinking they have an edge. For the first few matches, Kaiji does not bet over the old limit of 20,000 perica and everyone gets bored with Kaiji betting so little. On a challenge from Ōtsuki who must deal twice, Kaiji bets his entire 52,000 perica and signals the Forty-fivers who each bet 92,000 perica, for a total of 507,000 perica.
33	7	"Magic Dice"; Transliteration: "Mahō no Sai" (Japanese: 魔法の賽)	Tetsuo Yajima	Hideo Takayashiki	Hiroshi Kōjina	May 18, 2011
When the foreman sees that the Forty-fivers have bet all their money, he suspects that Kaiji has discovered how he is cheating. A backstory is then shown of when Ōtsuki and his men started cheating after purchasing special dice without the 1, 2 or 3 dots. Back at the game, Ōtsuki is forced to play with normal dice, taking his chances, but then suspects that Kaiji does not know how he cheats, so on the final throw he uses his special dice. Suddenly, Kaiji grabs the dice before they stop rolling.
34	8	"Divine Retribution"; Transliteration: "Ingaōhō" (Japanese: 因果応報)	Hong Hun-pyo	Mitsutaka Hirota	Morio Asaka	May 25, 2011
Kaiji shows everyone that Ōtsuki is cheating by using his special dice. He then tricks the foreman into betting again while Kaiji and his group use their own "special dice", with a 1 on each side, and thus Ōtsuki is forced to pay 5 times the amount they bet, losing 2,535,000 perica in total. Just when Ōtsuki was about to give up for the night, Kaiji reminds him that he still has to deal one more time according to the rules. The Forty-fivers then bet all 3,042,000 perica against the dealer.
35	9	"Cheers, and…" Transliteration: "Kassai, soshite..." (Japanese: 喝采、そして…)	Kim Min-sun	Hideo Takayashiki	Yoshiaki Kawajiri	June 1, 2011
Kurosaki intervenes and tells Ōtsuki that he has no choice but to play, and in the end, he loses 18,252,000 perica which Kaiji splits equally between the Forty-fivers. Kaiji then asks Kurosaki to approve their requests for the one-day outside pass and he agrees. The Forty-fivers insist that Kaiji should keep the money and twenty one-day outside passes, leaving him with ¥800,000 (around US$7,800) to gamble for the team and pay off their debts. Now back in society above ground, Kaiji meets Kōtarō Sakazaki who is looking for a partner to win big in the illegal casinos. Kaiji accepts his offer, and is taken to an illegal casino where he sees a huge Pachinko machine called "The Bog". Each ball is worth 1,000 times more than normal and the jackpot is worth ¥550 million, more than enough to free Kaiji from debt.
36	10	"The Last Gamble"; Transliteration: "Saigo no Bakuchi" (Japanese: 最後の博打)	Masaki Matsumura	Mitsutaka Hirota	Masaki Matsumura	June 8, 2011
When Kaiji is told there have only been two winners of the Bog, Hyōdō and Tonegawa, he realizes that the game must be rigged. He then agrees to work with Sakazaki for 10% of the possible ¥600 million payout from the Bog, however Sakazaki is secretive about the details of his plan which includes the machine's maintenance schedule. A day before their attempt to beat the Bog, Sakazaki appears with ¥50 million he 'borrowed' from the company president's safe where he works as a security guard. At the appointed day, Sakazaki commences to play the Bog.
37	11	"Joy and Lament"; Transliteration: "Kanki to Tansei" (Japanese: 歓喜と嘆声)	Woo Seung-wook	Hideo Takayashiki	Yoshiaki Kawajiri	June 15, 2011
Sakazaki starts to play the Bog, using an initial ¥10 million, dropping balls onto the final holed plate, but they do not have enough momentum. During the game Kaiji successfully passes Sakazaki his pre-prepared magnetized beer can and he prepares to use it to increase the centrifugal force of a ball to make it drop through the winning hole. However the effect is insignificant, but Sakazaki continues, wagering another ¥10 million. Kaiji overhears the security men talk of a device to prevent anyone winning and Kaiji warns Sakazaki's to stop, but he is in a gambling frenzy and continues to play using the money he 'borrowed' from the company safe.
38	12	"Heaven Falls, a Man Falls"; Transliteration: "Haten Hakan" (Japanese: 破天・破漢)	Jun Nakagawa; Tomomi Muraoka	Mitsutaka Hirota	Kenichi Kawamura	June 22, 2011
Sakazaki ignores Kaiji's warning and continues sinking money into the Bog, while the casino manager gives instructions to initiate the 'block' which controls the flippers, stopping the balls descending into the winning zone. Although Sakazaki is close to winning he collapses and the casino manager, Seiya Ichijō, introduces himself and reveals that they are using brass balls today which are not affected by magnetism. They leave with a little more than ¥6 million after losing over ¥43 million in two hours. The next day, Kaiji spends hours back at the casino, staring at the machine, then goes to the staff room to cash in one ball he found, insulting Ichijō but also gathering information about the casino's operations.
39	13	"A Clue"; Transliteration: "Kōryaku no Itoguchi" (Japanese: 攻略の糸口)	Tetsuo Yajima	Hideo Takayashiki	Tetsuo Yajima	June 29, 2011
Kaiji returns to the Sakazaki apartment, only to find it trashed and empty. Sakazaki has taken the last of his money to the race track. Kaiji's plan for revenge involves Sakazaki, so with a plan to beat the Bog, he tracks Sakazaki down at a Sapporo racetrack. Kaiji approaches Endō who is now broke but agrees to fund him, however it will cost ¥113 million including interest plus 50% of the winnings. Sakazaki violently objects but they end up agreeing to split the winnings three ways after costs.
40	14	"The Survivor's Road (Series Recap)"; Transliteration: "Burai no Kiseki (Sōshūhen)" (Japanese: 無頼の軌跡（総集編）)	Yuzo Sato	Hideo Takayashiki	Yuzo Sato	July 6, 2011
A recap of the events to date.
41	15	"All an Act"; Transliteration: "Koke no Isshin" (Japanese: 虚仮の一心)	Hong Hun-pyo	Mitsutaka Hirota	Yoshiaki Kawajiri	July 13, 2011
Sakazaki enters the casino to challenge the Bog again, dressed as a Komusō monk. He plays the machine, quickly losing his stake of ¥6 million, then attacks and damages it. Ichijō is suspicious of his behavior and realizes that it is a distraction and rushes to his office to find Kaiji there. Ichijō has Sakazaki beaten up and Kaiji tortured, then they are thrown out into the street. Days later, the Bog is repaired and operational again. It is Kaiji's final day on the surface and he arrives at the casino to challenge the unbeatable Pachinko machine.
42	16	"The Curtain Rises"; Transliteration: "Kessen no Makuake" (Japanese: 決戦の幕開け)	Kim Min-sun	Hideo Takayashiki	Yoshiaki Kawajiri	July 20, 2011
On Kaiji's last day above ground, he challenges the Bog and Kurosaki warns Ichijō that Kaiji must have a plan, and Ichijō's reputation is on the line. Kaiji starts playing and more balls than expected drop between the pins and Ichijō is suspicious. It takes him some time to realize that Kaiji somehow entered the staff room and doctored the setting gauges for adjusting the pins so they were set wider apart. Panicking, Ichijō has the 'block' turned on, directing the balls away from the winning path.
43	17	"Pointless Pounding"; Transliteration: "Fumō na Kantetsu" (Japanese: 不毛な貫徹)	Masaki Matsumura	Mitsutaka Hirota	Masaki Matsumura	July 27, 2011
Kaiji plays on even though it appears the chances of winning are zero. Meanwhile, Ichijō receives a request to send a live CCTV feed to the Teiai underground forced labor camp and to Hyōdō. Kaiji continues to play, even after losing ¥20 million in what seems a pointless exercise.
44	18	"Unyielding Gate"; Transliteration: "Teppeki no Mon" (Japanese: 鉄壁の門)	Woo Seung-wook	Hideo Takayashiki	Yoshiaki Kawajiri	August 3, 2011
Kaiji continues to play, with every ball deflected by the flippers until one ball makes it through to the plates below, the flipper rods bent because the replacement rods installed after Sakazaki smashed the machine were modified by Kaiji. Ichijō starts to panic and then receives a phone call from Hyōdō telling him to let the game continue and not bring the corporation into disrepute, under penalty of death. Ichijō now relies on his three rigged bottom plates to foil Kaiji's chances of winning.
45	19	"Road to a Miracle"; Transliteration: "Kiseki no Kidō" (Japanese: 奇跡の軌道)	Jun Nakagawa; Tomomi Muraoka	Mitsutaka Hirota	Jun Nakagawa; Tomomi Muraoka	August 10, 2011
Kaiji has only ¥20 million left to try to beat the Bog, however he is confident as he is aware of how the three bottom plates are rigged. He explained this to Sakazaki when they were at the racetrack. Slowly Ichijō comes to realize that Kaiji managed to not only tilt the machine to increase his odds of winning, but also create a slightly favorable tilt on the casino building. Unbeknownst to him, Kaiji's group had poured 20 tons of water into plastic tanks in a room on one side of the casino building, causing it to subside slightly on that side.
46	20	"Destiny Gap"; Transliteration: "Shukuun no Sa" (Japanese: 宿運の差)	Tetsuo Yajima	Hideo Takayashiki	Tetsuo Yajima	August 17, 2011
Kaiji's improbable idea of tilting the building to tilt the Bog pays off, and he gets closer to winning with more balls dropping onto the third and final plate. Ichijō contemplates the consequences of losing everything he has and tilts the machine again in the same direction to prevent balls reaching the third plate as Kaiji uses his last ¥10 million.
47	21	"Victory Secured"; Transliteration: "Kakujitsu na Shōri" (Japanese: 確実な勝利)	Hong Hun-pyo	Mitsutaka Hirota	Kenichi Kawamura	August 24, 2011
Kaiji plays on, but he is on the verge of defeat, having lost all his money. He convinces Endō to lend him his last ¥10 million against his better judgement, but at an exorbitant interest rate, and Kaiji returns to the machine for a final assault.
48	22	"The Power of Money"; Transliteration: "Yukichi no Ikō" (Japanese: 諭吉の威光)	Kim Min-sun	Hideo Takayashiki	Hiroyuki Tanaka	August 31, 2011
Kaiji commences to play with the last ¥10 million he borrowed from Endō for a final assault, unaware that Ichijō has tilted the machine in the same direction that Kaiji's group tilted the building, thus creating an almost insurmountable tilt on the first two plates. When half of the money is gone, Ichijō gloats to Kaiji that he can never win, but Kaiji says that he knows about the tilt. As the crowd watches, Kaiji tapes three ¥10,000 bills to the glass, hiding the three plates. In frustration, Ichijō rips them off to see a number of balls circulating on the plates because the losing holes have become clogged with balls which are unable to exit the machine. This increases Kaiji's probability of winning, however they still do not drop into the winning hole.
49	23	"On Thin Ice"; Transliteration: "Fūzen no Tomoshibi" (Japanese: 風前の灯火)	Masaki Matsumura	Mitsutaka Hirota	Masaki Matsumura	September 7, 2011
Kaiji realizes too late that the lean they created in the building also tilts slightly to the left, possibly eliminating his chances of a ball dropping into the rear winning hole. Also, with Ichijō now tilting the machine back to the front, the clogged balls may soon drop out. He is now in a race against time before the money runs out. Finally, two balls head for the winning hole, but unfortunately knock each other away.
50	24	"Meandering Silver Balls"; Transliteration: "Haikai Suru Gindama" (Japanese: 徘徊する銀玉)	Woo Seung-wook	Hideo Takayashiki	Yuzo Sato	September 14, 2011
Kaiji continues to play until the losing holes on even the third plate are blocked; however, Ichijō has the final weapon – air jets around the winning hole to deflect the balls. In the hushed silence, Kaiji hears the sound of hissing air and deduces what Ichijō has done. As Kaiji runs out of balls to play, the Teiai security men in black arrive to take him back underground. Kaiji proposes calling it a draw to Ichijō who refuses, forcing Kaiji to play his remaining balls and pray for a miracle.
51	25	"Tears of Resentment"; Transliteration: "Ensa no Namida" (Japanese: 怨嗟の涙)	Kenichi Kawamura	Mitsutaka Hirota	Kenichi Kawamura	September 21, 2011
Even with the plates filled to the brim with silver balls, Ichijō's secret weapon, the Curtain of Wind, prevents Kaiji from winning and Kaiji has run out of money. As he is dragged away, Sakazaki appears swearing vengeance on the machine, and gives Kaiji another ¥10 million which he again 'borrowed' from the company safe. Kaiji starts playing again with renewed vigor. The bottom plate is now awash with balls, but none can pass the curtain of wind around the winning hole. The machine appears to groan, and with the plate overflowing with balls, some cascade down the winning hole. Horrified that Kaiji won, Hyōdō sentences Ichijō to 1,050 years underground.
52	26	"The Future is in Our Hands…"; Transliteration: "Mirai wa Bokura no..." (Japanese: 未来は僕らの…)	Yuzo Sato; Jun Nakagawa; Tomomi Muraoka	Hideo Takayashiki	Yuzo Sato	September 28, 2011
As Ichijō is removed by the men in black, Kaiji tells him to fight his way back to the surface for a rematch. Meanwhile, Kaiji's friends cash in the balls he won for a total of over ¥729 million. Kaiji, Sakazaki and Endō settle their debts and split the remainder for almost ¥190 million each, from which Kaiji must pay back his friends in the underground labor camp. However, during a night of drinking and celebration, Endō drugs the other two and extracts his cut of Kaiji's money for the extortionate interest he charged for the last ¥10 million that he lent him, leaving Kaiji just over ¥61 million. The next day, the men in black arrive to pick up the money from Kaiji and free his underground friends, including the son of Ishida. However, on the day the Forty-fivers arrive on the surface, Kaiji is too ashamed to meet them because he lost his remaining money on a pachinko machine. Taking pity, one of the men in black gives him some money to celebrate with them.
