= List of Tobaku Datenroku Kaiji chapters =

First tankōbon volume cover of Tobaku Datenroku Kaiji

Tobaku Datenroku Kaiji is the third part of the manga series Kaiji by Nobuyuki Fukumoto. It ran in Kodansha's seinen manga magazine Weekly Young Magazine from 2004 to 2008. Kodansha collected its chapters in thirteen tankōbon volumes, released from November 5, 2004, to April 4, 2008. It was followed by the fourth part, Tobaku Datenroku Kaiji: Kazuya-hen.

== Volumes ==
No.	Release date	ISBN
01 (27)	November 5, 2004	978-4-06-361280-6
1. "Idle Life" (酔生, Suisei); 2. "Parasitism" (寄生, Kisei); 3. "Disconnection" (絶縁, Zetsuen); 4. "Persuasion" (勧誘, Kanyū); 5. "Parting" (訣別, Ketsubetsu); 6. "Sworn Friends" (盟友, Meiyū); 7. "Girding Up" (緊褌, Kinkon); 8. "Consent" (承諾, Shōdaku); 9. "Summary" (概要, Gaiyō)
02 (28)	March 4, 2005	978-4-06-361317-9
10. "Supplements" (補説, Hosetsu); 11. "Blind Spot" (死角, Shikaku); 12. "Spy" (間諜, Kanchō); 13. "Blindness" (失明, Shitsumei); 14. "Formula" (定石, Jōseki); 15. "Safety" (安全, Anzen); 16. "Austerity" (耐乏, Taibō); 17. "Dark Road" (暗路, Anro); 18. "Dilemma" (窮地, Kyūchi)
03 (29)	June 6, 2005	978-4-06-361346-9
19. "Return" (帰還, Kikan); 20. "Ground Bait" (撒餌, Makie); 21. "Preparation" (布石, Fuseki); 22. "Perfection" (万全, Banzen); 23. "Visitor" (来客, Raikyaku); 24. "Reunion" (再会, Saikai); 25. "Confusion" (狼狽, Rōbai); 26. "Assailing Criminals" (誅伐, Chūbatsu); 27. "Welcome" (歓迎, Kangei); 28. "Pretense" (擬装, Gisō)
04 (30)	October 6, 2005	978-4-06-361376-6
29. "Guidance" (誘導, Yūdō); 30. "Impatience" (焦燥, Shōsō); 31. "Misfire" (暴発, Bōhatsu); 32. "Knothole" (節穴, Fushiana); 33. "Faith" (信用, Shinyō); 34. "Misunderstanding" (誤解, Gokai); 35. "Indecision" (逡巡, Shunjun); 36. "Fortune" (吉凶, Kikkyō); 37. "Verge of Death" (死線, Shisen); 38. "Deploration" (慷慨, Kōgai)
05 (31)	January 6, 2006	978-4-06-361415-2
39. "Mud Transporter" (泥舟, Dorobune); 40. "Pricelessness" (千金, Senkin); 41. "Chivalry" (男気, Otokogi); 42. "Hot Wind" (熱風, Neppū); 43. "Accomplice" (同類, Dōrui); 44. "Relaxation" (弛緩, Shikan); 45. "Unexpected" (忽然, Kotsuzen); 46. "Off Course" (迷走, Meisō); 47. "Self-Condemnation" (自責, Jiseki); 48. "Chaining" (連鎖, Rensa)
06 (32)	April 6, 2006	978-4-06-361437-4
49. "Inspiration" (鼓舞, Kobu); 50. "Improvisation" (即興, Sokkyō); 51. "Repentance" (懺悔, Sange); 52. "Scrupulous" (入念, Nyūnen); 53. "Withering" (萎縮, Ishuku); 54. "Hardship" (難渋, Nanjū); 55. "Stinger" (毒針, Dokushin); 56. "Warning" (警報, Keihō); 57. "Arrangement" (整理, Seiri); 58. "Turmoil" (混迷, Konmei)
07 (33)	July 6, 2006	978-4-06-361457-2
59. "Idea" (一策, Issaku); 60. "Truth or Falsehood" (虚実, Kyojitsu); 61. "Identifying" (判明, Hanmei); 62. "Tactics" (細工, Saiku); 63. "Gash" (深手, Fukade); 64. "Ensnaring" (籠絡, Rōraku); 65. "Resentment" (怨嗟, Ensa); 66. "Bright Light" (光明, Kōmyō); 67. "Sorting" (選別, Senbetsu); 68. "Vacillation" (躊躇, Chūcho)
08 (34)	November 6, 2006	978-4-06-361494-7
69. "Acting" (演技, Engi); 70. "Exception" (特例, Tokurei); 71. "Treatment" (処遇, Shogū); 72. "Heavy Pressure" (重圧, Jūatsu); 73. "Obsession" (執着, Shūchaku); 74. "Obstruction" (閉塞, Heisoku); 75. "Scales" (天秤, Tenbin); 76. "Immediacy" (直感, Chokkan); 77. "Suspicion" (猜疑, Saigi); 78. "Boundless" (漠々, Bakubaku)
09 (35)	February 6, 2007	978-4-06-361524-1
79. "Rotten Smell" (腐臭, Fushū); 80. "Olfaction" (嗅覚, Kyūkaku); 81. "Reins" (手綱, Dazuna); 82. "Expedient" (捷径, Shōkei); 83. "Lawless" (無法, Muhō); 84. "At Heart" (腹中, Fukuchū); 85. "Unforeseen" (不測, Fusoku); 86. "Insurance" (保険, Hoken); 87. "Right Time" (時宜, Jigi); 88. "Certain Defeat" (必敗, Hippai)
10 (36)	June 6, 2007	978-4-06-361553-1
89. "Oscillation" (動揺, Dōyō); 90. "Rebuttal" (反駁, Hanbaku); 91. "Strife" (波風, Kamikaze); 92. "Serenity" (平静, Heisei); 93. "Nightmare" (悪夢, Akumu); 94. "Concern" (懸念, Kenen); 95. "Big Lie" (大嘘, Ōuso); 96. "Ghost" (亡者, Mōja); 97. "Much Thought" (千慮, Senryo); 98. "Subtract" (減点, Genten)
11 (37)	September 6, 2007	978-4-06-361587-6
99. "Twilight" (逢魔, Ōma); 100. "Memory" (記憶, Kioku); 101. "Nonexistent" (皆無, Kaimu); 102. "Shortcut" (間道, Kandō); 103. "Oracle" (神託, Shintaku); 104. "Secret Technique" (秘技, Higi); 105. "Agreement" (符合, Fugō); 106. "Magnetic Field" (磁場, Jiba); 107. "Drifting" (漂流, Hyōryū); 108. "Excessive" (過分, Kabun); 109. "Oppression" (圧迫, Appaku)
12 (38)	December 28, 2007	978-4-06-361631-6
110. "Opening of Hostilities" (戦端, Sentan); 111. "Fruitless Flower" (徒花, Adabana); 112. "Immobility" (不動, Fudō); 113. "Fierce Attack" (猛攻, Mōkō); 114. "Magic" (魔力, Maryoku); 115. "Exultation" (雀躍, Jakuyaku); 116. "Full Throttle" (全開, Zenkai); 117. "Enforcement" (強行, Kyōkō); 118. "Refutation" (論駁, Ronbaku); 119. "Disregard" (不問, Fumon); 120. "Scrutiny" (精査, Seisa); 121. "Shudder" (戦慄, Senritsu)
13 (39)	April 4, 2008	978-4-06-361648-4
122. "Shallow" (浅薄, Senpaku); 123. "Courage" (胆力, Tanryoku); 124. "Dirty Trick" (毒牙, Dokuga); 125. "Swamp" (泥沼, Doronuma); 126. "Discard Win" (栄和, Ronhō); 127. "Exposure" (露見, Roken); 128. "Foresight" (遠謀, Enbō); 129. "Tidal Wave" (津波, Tsunami); 130. "Intimidation" (恫喝, Dōkatsu); 131. "Ignition" (点火, Tenka)

== Omnibus edition ==
No.	Title	Release date	ISBN
1	Minefield Game "17 Steps" 1: Awakening Subjugation; Jirai Gēmu "17-hō" (1) Kakusei Tōbatsu-hen (地雷ゲーム『17歩』 (1) 覚醒討伐編)	April 7, 2010	978-4-06-374593-1
2	Minefield Game "17 Steps" 2: Fierce Crushing Blow; Jirai Gēmu "17-hō" (2) Mōkō Tettsui-hen (地雷ゲーム『17歩』 (2) 猛攻鉄槌編)	April 21, 2010	978-4-06-374601-3
3	Minefield Game "17 Steps" 3: Meandering Four Concealed Triplets; Jirai Gēmu "17-hō" (3) Meisō Sūankō-hen (地雷ゲーム『17歩』 (3) 迷走四暗刻編)	May 6, 2010	978-4-06-374610-5
4	Minefield Game "17 Steps" 4: Through Thick and Thin; Jirai Gēmu "17-hō" (4) Gashinshōtan-hen (地雷ゲーム『17歩』 (4) 臥薪嘗胆編)	May 19, 2010	978-4-06-374618-1
5	Minefield Game "17 Steps" 5: Impreaching Mahjong; Jirai Gēmu "17-hō" (5) Dangai Tōhai-hen (地雷ゲーム『17歩』 (5) 弾劾闘牌編)	June 2, 2010	978-4-06-374627-3
6	Minefield Game "17 Steps" 6: Turnabout Victory; Jirai Gēmu "17-hō" (6) Gyakuten Daihōra-hen (地雷ゲーム『17歩』 (6) 逆転大和了編)	June 16, 2010	978-4-06-374636-5
