= Kaiji 2 =

2011 live action adaptation of the Kaiji manga

- Film poster
- Directed by: Tōya Satō
- Written by: Nobuyuki Fukumoto; Junya Yamazaki; Sachiko Ōguchi
- Based on: Tobaku Hakairoku Kaiji by Nobuyuki Fukumoto
- Produced by: Seiji Okuda; Osamu Kamikura; Toshio Nakatani; Hiroshi Miyazaki
- Starring: Tatsuya Fujiwara; Yūsuke Iseya; Yuriko Yoshitaka; Katsuhisa Namase; Teruyuki Kagawa
- Cinematography: Osamu Fujiishi
- Edited by: Mototaka Kusakabe
- Music by: Yugo Kanno
- Production company: AX-ON
- Distributed by: Toho
- Release date: November 5, 2011
- Running time: 133 minutes
- Country: Japan
- Language: Japanese
- Box office: $21 million

Kaiji 2 (Japanese: カイジ2 人生奪回ゲーム, Hepburn: Kaiji 2 Jinsei Dakkai Gēmu; lit. 'Kaiji 2: Life Recovery Game') is a 2011 Japanese live-action film based on Tobaku Hakairoku Kaiji, the second part of the manga series Kaiji by Nobuyuki Fukumoto. It is the second installment of the Kaiji film series directed by Tōya Satō, and premiered in Japan on November 5, 2011. It was followed by Kaiji: Final Game, released in 2020.

== Plot ==
Set one year after Kaiji Itō's victory against the Teiai Group. Despite his earlier success, Kaiji has returned to poverty and is forced back into labor to repay his debts. With the help of allies, he re-enters the world of high-stakes gambling, aiming to win ¥200 million within two weeks to secure freedom for himself and others enslaved by Teiai's debt system.

The contests include Chinchirorin, a traditional dice game with variable rewards; the Princess and the Slave, a life-or-death game requiring strategic door selection; and the Swamp, an elaborate pachinko machine with nearly impossible odds. Kaiji confronts Seiya Ichijō, the orchestrator of the Swamp, in a final bid to escape his relentless cycle of debt and subjugation.

== Cast ==
- Tatsuya Fujiwara as Kaiji Itō
- Yūsuke Iseya as Seiya Ichijō
- Yuriko Yoshitaka as Hiromi Ishida
- Katsuhisa Namase as Kōtarō Sakazaki
- Teruyuki Kagawa as Yukio Tonegawa
- Suzuki Matsuo as Taro Ōtsuki
- Hayato Kakizawa as Murakami
- Ken Mitsuishi as Kōji Ishida
- Tarō Yamamoto as Jōji Funai
- Kyūsaku Shimada as Yoshihiro Kurosaki

== Soundtrack ==
Yugo Kanno composed the music for the film. The original score was released on November 2, 2011.

== Release ==
Kaiji 2 was announced in November 2009. Kaiji 2 was theatrically released on November 5, 2011, in Japan. It was released on Blu-ray and DVD on April 25, 2012.

The film was screened at the anime convention AM² in Anaheim, California in June 2012.

== Reception ==
=== Box office ===
Kaiji 2 was Japan's nineteenth highest-grossing film of 2011, earning ¥1.61 billion ($21 million) at the box office that year. The film also grossed $68,175 overseas in Singapore.

=== Critical reception ===
Maggie Lee of The Hollywood Reporter criticized the film for its lack of tension and shallow characters, noting that despite the cast's heightened performances, their roles remained "cardboard". She found the betrayals predictable, especially for fans of survival-game stories like Liar Game or The Incite Mill, writing that the shifting alliances no longer surprise. Still, she praised the film's energetic camerawork and sound design, calling it a "geeky but still entertaining sequel to the crowd-pleasing "gambling" genre."
