= Kaiji: Final Game =

2020 live action adaptation of the Kaiji manga

- Film poster
- Directed by: Tōya Satō
- Written by: Nobuyuki Fukumoto; Yūichi Tokunaga
- Based on: Kaiji by Nobuyuki Fukumoto
- Produced by: Keiichi Sawa; Yoshitaka Hori; Minami Ichikawa; Takeshi Kikukawa; Masatoshi Kakuda; Masatoshi Yamaguchi
- Starring: Tatsuya Fujiwara; Sota Fukushi; Nagisa Sekimizu; Mackenyu; Kōtarō Yoshida
- Cinematography: Takashi Ohara
- Edited by: Takashi Satō
- Music by: Yugo Kanno
- Production company: AX-ON
- Distributed by: Toho
- Release date: January 10, 2020
- Running time: 127 minutes
- Country: Japan
- Language: Japanese
- Box office: $19.9 million

Kaiji: Final Game (Japanese: カイジ ファイナルゲーム, Hepburn: Kaiji Fainaru Gēmu) is a 2020 Japanese live-action film based on the manga series Kaiji by Nobuyuki Fukumoto. It is the third installment of the Kaiji film series directed by Tōya Satō and premiered in Japan on January 10, 2020. Unlike the first two previous films, Kaiji and Kaiji 2, Kaiji: Final Game is not based on a specific part of the series and it is a completely original story written by Fukumoto. A fourth film, titled Kaiji: Jinsei Revenge Game, is set to premiere in 2027.

== Plot ==
The story takes place in 2020 Japan following the Tokyo Olympics, as the nation experiences rapid economic collapse. Hyperinflation destabilizes society while government insolvency leads to widespread exploitation of workers. Kaiji Itō, living in poverty, struggles with daily survival when he learns his former overseer Tarō Ōtsuki has become president of the Teiai conglomerate. Ōtsuki recruits Kaiji to participate in "Tower of Babel", a high-stakes gambling event designed to entertain wealthy elites while offering desperate participants a chance at fortune. Subsequent games—including the asset-based "Final Judgment", the lethal "Dream Jump", and the modified "Gold Rock Paper Scissors"—test both Kaiji's gambling skills and his ability to survive Teiai's exploitative system. As the challenges escalate, Kaiji must rely on his wits to navigate the deadly games and confront the conglomerate's corruption.

== Cast ==
- Tatsuya Fujiwara as Kaiji Itō
- Nagisa Sekimizu as Kanako Kirino
- Mackenyu as Minato Hirose
- Sota Fukushi as Kōsuke Takakura
- Kōtarō Yoshida as Yoshihiro Kurosaki
- Suzuki Matsuo as Tarō Ōtsuki
- Yūki Amami as Rinko Endō
- Katsuhisa Namase as Kōtarō Sakazaki
- Ikusaburo Yamazaki as Keiji Nishino
- Masatō Ibu as Shigeru Tōgō
- Toshiki Seto as Taichi Sugawara
- Mariko Shinoda as Last Judgement challenger
- Akio Kaneda as Sōichirō Shibusawa
- Gōki Maeda as Tsuyoshi Takase

== Soundtrack ==
Yugo Kanno composed the music for the film. The original score was released on January 8, 2020.

== Release ==
In May 2019, Kaiji: Final Game, the third film of the Kaiji live-action film series was announced, with a completely original story by Nobuyuki Fukumoto.

Kaiji: Final Game was theatrically released on January 10, 2020 in Japan.

The film premiered in Singapore on March 5, 2020. It was originally planned to premiere in Malaysia on March 19, 2020, but it was delayed due to the COVID-19 pandemic, and the film opened on July 1, 2020. The film was released in Indonesia on December 9, 2020.

== Novelization ==
A novelization of the film written by Van Madoy was published by Kodansha on November 14, 2019.

== Reception ==
=== Box office ===
During the opening weekend, Kaiji: Final Game ranked at second at the Japanese box office, earning ¥362 million ($3.29 million), and earned ¥616 million ($5.60 million) from January 10–13. The film stayed at second in its third weekend and earned an additional ¥198,153,400 ($1.81 million). The film dropped to fourth in its fourth weekend, and earned ¥120,022,950 ($1.10 million). The film dropped from eighth to tenth in its sixth weekend and earned ¥35,480,750 ($323,000). It was the eighth highest grossing film of 2020, earning ¥2.06 billion ($21 million) at the box office that year. It also grossed $14,608 in Vietnam.

=== Critical reception ===
Marcus Goh of Yahoo! Style rated the film 3.5/5, praising its strong start as a "mild political commentary on the labour market in Japan" and the thrilling Tower of Babel game. However, he found the later games lackluster and noted that some manga-inspired elements felt awkward with live-action actors. While he appreciated the film's faithfulness to the spirit of the source material, he felt it sometimes adhered too closely, creating awkward moments. Still, he concluded that fans would enjoy seeing Kaiji return to the big screen.

Tay Yek Keak of Today called the film "enjoyably fascinating and intellectually stimulating", praising its expanded national-scale ambition. He noted that Fujiwara's Kaiji looks unchanged from the first film, with the only sign of the 11-year gap being the more subdued final game. While acknowledging its drawn-out runtime and Japanese cinema's trademark outlandish clichés, Keak found its dark financial apocalypse concept "grimly thrilling".
