= List of Tobaku Hakairoku Kaiji chapters =

First tankōbon volume cover of Tobaku Hakairoku Kaiji

Tobaku Hakairoku Kaiji is the second part of the manga series Kaiji by Nobuyuki Fukumoto. It ran in Kodansha's seinen manga magazine Weekly Young Magazine from 2000 to 2004. Kodansha collected its chapters in thirteen tankōbon volumes, released from November 6, 2000, to April 4, 2004. It was followed by the third part, Tobaku Datenroku Kaiji. Tobaku Hakairoku Kaiji was adapted by Madhouse into an anime television series, Kaiji: Against All Rules, which was broadcast in 2011.

== Volumes ==
| No. | Release date | ISBN |
|---|---|---|
| 01 (14) | November 6, 2000 | 978-4-06-336910-6 |
1. "Whereabouts" (行方, Yukue); 2. "Addiction" (中毒, Chūdoku); 3. "Sinking" (陥落, Kanraku); 4. "Underground" (地下, Chika); 5. "Salary" (給与, Kyūyo); 6. "Shock" (震盪, Shintō); 7. "Crack" (亀裂, Kiretsu); 8. "Breach" (決壊, Kekkai); 9. "Over-Confident" (自負, Jifu); 10. "Dice Roll" (出目, Deme); 11. "Ironclad Rule" (鉄則, Tessoku)
| 02 (15) | March 6, 2001 | 978-4-06-336936-6 |
12. "Hesitation" (躊躇, Chūcho); 13. "Arrival" (到来, Tōrai); 14. "Fearless" (不敵, Futeki); 15. "Bloodsucking" (吸血, Kyūketsu); 16. "Divide" (分水, Bunsui); 17. "Howl" (咆哮, Hōkō); 18. "Faint" (卒倒, Sottō); 19. "Frail" (脆弱, Seijaku); 20. "Optimism" (楽天, Rakuten); 21. "Frenzy" (逆上, Gyakujō); 22. "Emergency" (焦眉, Shōbi); 23. "Impending Danger" (逼迫, Hippaku)
| 03 (16) | July 6, 2001 | 978-4-06-336960-1 |
24. "Teaming Up" (団結, Danketsu); 25. "Father and Son" (父子, Fushi); 26. "Snapping" (発止, Hasshi); 27. "Abuse" (虐待, Gyakutai); 28. "Acquisition" (獲得, Kakutoku); 29. "Idle Spectator" (座視, Zashi); 30. "Invitation" (招聘, Shōhei); 31. "Looking Around" (環視, Kanshi); 32. "The Weak" (弱者, Jakusha); 33. "Torrent" (奔流, Honryū); 34. "Concord" (呼応, Koō)
| 04 (17) | November 6, 2001 | 978-4-06-336994-6 |
35. "Witchcraft" (魔法, Mahō); 36. "Scandal" (疑獄, Gigoku); 37. "Clear Observation" (止観, Shikan); 38. "Agreement" (符合, Fugō); 39. "Usurpation" (奪取, Dasshu); 40. "Fire Alarm" (半鐘, Hanshō); 41. "Depriving" (褫奪, Chidatsu); 42. "Humility" (謙譲, Kenjō); 43. "Retribution" (応報, Ōhō); 44. "Atonement" (贖罪, Shokuzai); 45. "Cheers" (喝采, Kassai)
| 05 (18) | March 6, 2002 | 978-4-06-361025-3 |
46. "Foolish Undertaking" (愚挙, Gukyo); 47. "Sunlight" (陽光, Yōkō); 48. "Hustle and Bustle" (喧噪, Kensō); 49. "Immanence" (内在, Naizai); 50. "Reign" (君臨, Kunrin); 51. "Achievement" (達成, Tassei); 52. "Complicity" (共犯, Kyōhan); 53. "Conviction" (信念, Shinnen); 54. "Planning Together" (参画, Sankaku); 55. "Debt" (借金, Shakkin); 56. "Sortie" (出撃, Shutsugeki)
| 06 (19) | June 6, 2002 | 978-4-06-361047-5 |
57. "Festival" (祭礼, Sairei); 58. "Barrier" (関門, Kanmon); 59. "Taking Control" (自前, Jimae); 60. "Wandering About" (徘徊, Haikai); 61. "Lost for Words" (絶句, Zekku); 62. "Inhibition" (制止, Seishi); 63. "Contradiction" (撞着, Dōchaku); 64. "Other Side" (裏側, Uragawa); 65. "Obstacle" (障害, Shōgai); 66. "Squall" (突風, Toppū); 67. "Scattering" (飛散, Hisan)
| 07 (20) | October 4, 2002 | 978-4-06-361076-5 |
68. "Craving" (渇望, Katsubō); 69. "Deliberate" (深謀, Shinbō); 70. "Unique" (唯一, Yuiitsu); 71. "Jolt" (蕩揺, Tōyō); 72. "Confirmation" (確認, Kakunin); 73. "Travelling on Foot" (踏破, Tōha); 74. "Alarm Bell" (早鐘, Hayagane); 75. "Expedition" (遠征, Ensei); 76. "Old Friend" (旧友, Kyūyū); 77. "Banner of Revolution" (反旗, Hanki)
| 08 (21) | December 26, 2002 | 978-4-06-361097-0 |
78. "Alliance" (同盟, Dōmei); 79. "Folly" (虚仮, Koke); 80. "Lighting a Torch" (火点, Hiten); 81. "Discernment" (洞察, Dōsatsu); 82. "Lapse of Memory" (忘却, Bōkyaku); 83. "Glaring" (睥睨, Heigei); 84. "Prospects" (形勢, Keisei); 85. "Squirming" (蠢動, Shundō); 86. "Injustice" (失当, Shittō); 87. "Desecration" (冒瀆, Bōtoku)
| 09 (22) | April 4, 2003 | 978-4-06-361122-9 |
88. "Trap" (陥穽, Kansei); 89. "Tranquility" (鎮静, Chinsei); 90. "Realization" (貫徹, Kantetsu); 91. "Sneer" (嗤笑, Shishō); 92. "Furlough" (賜暇, Shika); 93. "Admonishment" (教戒, Kyōkai); 94. "Answer" (返答, Hentō); 95. "Opening Gate" (開門, Kaimon); 96. "Fuse" (信管, Shinkan); 97. "Disguise" (偽装, Gisō)
| 10 (23) | September 5, 2003 | 978-4-06-361160-1 |
98. "Controversy" (物議, Butsugi); 99. "Strict Order" (厳命, Genmei); 100. "Rift" (亀裂, Kiretsu); 101. "Fallen Leaves" (落葉, Ochiba); 102. "Evil Omen" (凶兆, Kyōchō); 103. "Slanting Surface" (斜面, Shamen); 104. "Leaning Tower" (斜塔, Shatō); 105. "All Means" (万策, Bansaku); 106. "Success in Life" (立身, Risshin); 107. "Enlightenment" (啓蒙, Keimō)
| 11 (24) | December 25, 2003 | 978-4-06-361191-5 |
108. "Destiny" (宿運, Shuku'un); 109. "Plain Luck" (平運, Heiun); 110. "Submission" (往生, Ōjō); 111. "Pledge" (誓約, Seiyaku); 112. "Delay" (延引, En'in); 113. "Penetration" (看破, Kanpa); 114. "Magic Trick" (手品, Tejina); 115. "Counter-Current" (逆流, Gyakuryū); 116. "Time is Ripe" (熟機, Jukuki)
| 12 (25) | March 5, 2004 | 978-4-06-361213-4 |
117. "Omission" (遺漏, Irō); 118. "Dystocia" (難産, Nanzan); 119. "Remains" (残滓, Zanshi); 120. "Overflowing" (氾濫, Hanran); 121. "Checkmate" (王手, Ōte); 122. "Meandering" (徘徊, Haikai); 123. "Calamity" (惨禍, Sanka); 124. "Proposition" (提案, Teian); 125. "Ashes" (灰燼, Kaijin)
| 13 (26) | April 4, 2004 | 978-4-06-361222-6 |
126. "Lone Force" (孤軍, Kogun); 127. "Siege" (包囲, Hōi); 128. "Crushed to Death" (圧殺, Assatsu); 129. "Full Bloom" (満開, Mankai); 130. "Release" (解放, Kaihō); 131. "Good Drink" (美酒, Bishu); 132. "Dispersing" (退散, Taisan); 133. "Scrap Paper" (反故, Hogo); 134. "Departure" (門出, Kadode)

== Omnibus edition ==
| No. | Title | Release date | ISBN |
|---|---|---|---|
| 1 | Hell Cee-lo 1: Underground Slave Labor; Jigoku Chinchiro (1) Chika Kyōseirōdō-hen (地獄チンチロ (1) 地下強制労働編) | October 5, 2005 | 978-4-06-371629-0 |
| 2 | Hell Cee-lo 2: Underground Facility Breakout; Jigoku Chinchiro (2) Chika Shisetsu Dasshutsu-hen (地獄チンチロ (2) 地下施設脱出編) | October 5, 2005 | 978-4-06-371630-6 |
| 3 | Man-Eating Pachinko 1: 1000-fold Payout Machine, "The Bog"; Hito-kui Pachinko (1) 1000-bai Dai "Numa"-hen (人食いパチンコ (1) 1000倍台"沼"編) | October 19, 2005 | 978-4-06-371635-1 |
| 4 | Man-Eating Pachinko 2: Silver Ball Avici; Hito-kui Pachinko (2) Gindama Mugenjigoku-hen (人食いパチンコ (2) 銀玉無間地獄編) | November 2, 2005 | 978-4-06-371644-3 |
| 5 | Man-Eating Pachinko 3: Sure-Fire "Bog" Strategy Guide; Hito-kui Pachinko (3) Hisshō "Numa" Kōryaku-hen (人食いパチンコ (3) 必勝"沼"攻略編) | November 16, 2005 | 978-4-06-371647-4 |
| 6 | Man-Eating Pachinko 4: Turnaround Liberalization; Hito-kui Pachinko (4) Gyakushū Daikaihō-hen (人食いパチンコ (4) 逆襲大開放編) | December 7, 2005 | 978-4-06-371654-2 |
