= Jōkyō Seikatsuroku Ichijō =

Japanese manga series

- First tankōbon volume cover, featuring Seiya Ichijō

上京生活録イチジョウ
- Manga
- Written by: Tensei Hagiwara; Nobuyuki Fukumoto (collaboration)
- Illustrated by: Tomoki Miyoshi; Yoshiaki Seto
- Published by: Kodansha
- Imprint: Morning KC
- Magazine: Morning
- Original run: January 21, 2021 – January 12, 2023
- Volumes: 6
- icon

Jōkyō Seikatsuroku Ichijō (Japanese: 上京生活録イチジョウ; lit. 'Ichijō: Life in Tokyo') is a Japanese manga series written by Tensei Hagiwara and illustrated by Tomoki Miyoshi and Yoshiaki Seto. It is a spin-off of the main series Kaiji by Nobuyuki Fukumoto. It was serialized in Kodansha's seinen manga magazine Morning from January 2021 to January 2023, with its chapters collected in six tankōbon volumes.

== Publication ==
Jōkyō Seikatsuroku Ichijō, written by Tensei Hagiwara and illustrated by Tomoki Miyoshi and Yoshiaki Seto, was serialized in Kodansha's seinen manga magazine Morning from January 21, 2021, to January 12, 2023. Kodansha collected its chapters in six tankōbon volumes, released from July 20, 2021, to March 6, 2023.

=== Volumes ===
| No. | Release date | ISBN |
|---|---|---|
| 1 | July 20, 2021 | 978-4-06-523779-3 |
| 2 | September 22, 2021 | 978-4-06-524576-7 |
| 3 | March 4, 2022 | 978-4-06-526689-2 |
| 4 | May 23, 2022 | 978-4-06-527861-1 |
| 5 | October 6, 2022 | 978-4-06-529148-1 |
| 6 | March 6, 2023 | 978-4-06-531024-3 |
