= List of Tobaku Datenroku Kaiji: Kazuya-hen chapters =

First tankōbon volume cover of Tobaku Datenroku Kaiji: Kazuya-hen

Tobaku Datenroku Kaiji: Kazuya-hen is the fourth part of the manga series Kaiji by Nobuyuki Fukumoto. It ran in Kodansha's seinen manga magazine Weekly Young Magazine from 2009 to 2013. Kodansha collected its chapters in ten tankōbon volumes, released from October 6, 2009, to July 5, 2013. It was followed by the fifth part, Tobaku Datenroku Kaiji: One Poker-hen.

== Volumes ==
| No. | Release date | ISBN |
|---|---|---|
| 01 (40) | October 6, 2009 | 978-4-06-361845-7 |
1. "Beaten Track" (常軌, Jōki); 2. "Gravestone" (墓標, Bohyō); 3. "Brat" (餓鬼, Gaki); 4. "Criticism" (非難, Hinan); 5. "Despair" (絶望, Zetsubō); 6. "Objective" (目標, Mokuhyō); 7. "Vigilantism" (私刑, Shikei); 8. "Knight" (騎士, Kishi); 9. "Supplication" (切願, Setsugan); 10. "Light and Darkness" (明暗, Meian)
| 02 (41) | February 5, 2010 | 978-4-06-361870-9 |
11. "Scream" (絶叫, Zekkyō); 12. "Truth" (真実, Shinjitsu); 13. "Experiment" (実験, Jikken); 14. "Friendship" (友情, Yūjō); 15. "100 Million" (1億, 1-Oku); 16. "Hostage" (人質, Hitojichi); 17. "Logic" (論理, Ronri); 18. "Crisis" (危機, Kiki); 19. "Sensation" (感覚, Kankaku); 20. "Discrepancy" (錯誤, Sakugo)
| 03 (42) | June 4, 2010 | 978-4-06-361903-4 |
21. "Intention" (意思, Ishi); 22. "Conversation" (会話, Kaiwa); 23. "Understanding" (理解, Rikai); 24. "Sharing" (共有, Kyōyū); 25. "Optimism" (楽観, Rakkan); 26. "Chance Meeting" (邂逅, Haikō); 27. "Dash" (驀進, Bakushin); 28. "Remaining in Obscurity" (雌伏, Shifuku); 29. "Sudden Change" (急転, Kyūten); 30. "Disappointment" (失意, Shitsui)
| 04 (43) | October 6, 2010 | 978-4-06-361947-8 |
31. "Presumption" (推測, Suisoku); 32. "Good and Evil" (清濁, Seidaku); 33. "Monetary Power" (金力, Kinryoku); 34. "Glory" (栄光, Eikō); 35. "Bomb" (爆弾, Bakudan); 36. "Friend" (仲間, Nakama); 37. "Distortion" (歪曲, Waikyoku); 38. "Change" (変化, Henka); 39. "Karma" (因果, Inga); 40. "Craftsmanship" (細工, Saiku)
| 05 (44) | February 4, 2011 | 978-4-06-361996-6 |
41. "Battering" (乱打, Randa); 42. "Breakdown" (故障, Koshō); 43. "Straying" (迷走, Meisō); 44. "Reason" (理由, Riyū); 45. "Attitude" (態度, Taido); 46. "Forked Road" (岐路, Kiro); 47. "Perception" (認識, Ninshiki); 48. "Doubt" (疑問, Gimon); 49. "Blank Space" (空白, Kūhaku); 50. "Stupefaction" (自失, Jishitsu)
| 06 (45) | June 6, 2011 | 978-4-06-382037-9 |
51. "Fretfulness" (焦燥, Shōsō); 52. "Bounds" (限界, Genkai); 53. "Maliciousness" (邪気, Jaki); 54. "Desperate" (必死, Hisshi); 55. "Impact" (迫力, Hakuryoku); 56. "Raffle" (抽選, Chūsen); 57. "Confusion" (狼狽, Rōbai); 58. "Continuous Calling" (連呼, Renko); 59. "Alert" (待機, Taiki); 60. "Devil" (魔物, Mamono)
| 07 (46) | October 28, 2011 | 978-4-06-382093-5 |
61. "Divergence" (分岐, Bunki); 62. "Menace" (脅威, Kyōi); 63. "Upsetting" (心外, Shingai); 64. "Communication" (伝達, Dentatsu); 65. "Listening Closely" (傾聴, Keichō); 66. "Affection" (慈愛, Jiai); 67. "Assertion" (主張, Shuchō); 68. "Gambling" (博奕, Bakueki); 69. "Guidance" (誘導, Yūdō); 70. "Spite" (悪意, Akui)
| 08 (47) | March 6, 2012 | 978-4-06-382145-1 |
71. "Definition" (確定, Kakutei); 72. "Shriek" (悲鳴, Himei); 73. "Signpost" (道標, Dōhyō); 74. "Result" (結果, Kekka); 75. "Fortune" (好事, Kōji); 76. "Exhaustion" (脱力, Datsuryoku); 77. "Two Choices" (二択, Nitaku); 78. "Hell Fire" (業火, Gōka); 79. "Problem" (問題, Mondai); 80. "Maturing" (熟成, Jukusei)
| 09 (48) | July 6, 2012 | 978-4-06-382192-5 |
81. "Fruit" (果実, Kajitsu); 82. "Decision" (決断, Ketsudan); 83. "Single Word" (一言, Hitogoto); 84. "Real Intention" (真意, Shin'i); 85. "1 Minute" (1分, 1-Pun); 86. "Extension" (延長, Enchō); 87. "Vulnerable" (弱者, Jakusha); 88. "True Character" (地金, Jigane); 89. "Inhuman" (非道, Hidō); 90. "Temper" (機嫌, Kigen)
| 10 (49) | July 5, 2013 | 978-4-06-382319-6 |
91. "Pressure" (圧迫, Appaku); 92. "Compensation" (対価, Taika); 93. "Formulation" (構築, Kōchiku); 94. "Selflessness" (無我, Muga); 95. "True Character" (本性, Honshō); 96. "Parting Regrets" (惜別, Sekibetsu); 97. "Gemstones" (玉石, Gyokuseki); 98. "Long Night" (長夜, Chōya); 99. "Belief" (信奉, Shinpō); 100. "Explanation" (説明, Setsumei)
