= Kaiji (manga) =

Japanese manga series

- Gambling Apocalypse: Kaiji
- Cover of the first Gambling Apocalypse: Kaiji tankōbon volume, featuring Kaiji Itō

賭博黙示録カイジ (Tobaku Mokushiroku Kaiji)
- Genre: Action; Gambling; Suspense
- Manga
- Written by: Nobuyuki Fukumoto
- Published by: Kodansha
- English publisher: NA: Denpa; Manga Planet (digital); Crunchyroll Manga (digital)
- Imprint: YMKC (former); YMKC Special (current)
- Magazine: Weekly Young Magazine
- Original run: February 19, 1996 – present
- Volumes: 91
- Series titles
- Gambling Apocalypse: Kaiji; (1996–1999, 13 volumes); Tobaku Hakairoku Kaiji; (2000–2004, 13 volumes); Tobaku Datenroku Kaiji; (2004–2008, 13 volumes); Tobaku Datenroku Kaiji: Kazuya-hen; (2009–2012, 10 volumes); Tobaku Datenroku Kaiji: One Poker-hen; (2013–2017, 16 volumes); Tobaku Datenroku Kaiji: 24 Oku Dasshutsu-hen; (2017–present, 26 volumes)
- Anime television series

Kaiji: Ultimate Survivor
- Directed by: Yuzo Sato
- Produced by: Toshio Nakatani; Manabu Tamura
- Written by: Hideo Takayashiki
- Music by: Hideki Taniuchi
- Studio: Madhouse
- Licensed by: Crunchyroll (streaming); BI: Anime Limited; NA: Sentai Filmworks
- Original network: Nippon TV
- Original run: October 3, 2007 – April 2, 2008
- Episodes: 26
- Anime television series

Kaiji: Against All Rules
- Directed by: Yuzo Sato
- Produced by: Toshio Nakatani; Manabu Tamura; Naoki Iwasa (17–26)
- Written by: Hideo Takayashiki
- Music by: Hideki Taniuchi
- Studio: Madhouse
- Licensed by: Crunchyroll (streaming); BI: Anime Limited; NA: Sentai Filmworks
- Original network: Nippon TV
- Original run: April 6, 2011 – September 28, 2011
- Episodes: 26
- Live-action films
- Kaiji films: Kaiji (2009); Kaiji 2 (2011); Kaiji: Final Game (2020); Kaiji: Jinsei Revenge Game (2027); Animal World (2018)
- Spin-offs
- Mr. Tonegawa: Middle Management Blues; 1-nichi Gaishutsuroku Hanchō; Jōkyō Seikatsuroku Ichijō
- icon

Gambling Apocalypse: Kaiji (Japanese: 賭博黙示録カイジ, Hepburn: Tobaku Mokushiroku Kaiji) is a Japanese manga series written and illustrated by Nobuyuki Fukumoto. The story centers on Kaiji Itō, a consummate gambler, and his misadventures around gambling. It was serialized in Kodansha's seinen manga magazine Weekly Young Magazine from 1996 to 1999, and has been followed by five series: Tobaku Hakairoku Kaiji (2000–2004); Tobaku Datenroku Kaiji (2004–2008); Tobaku Datenroku Kaiji: Kazuya-hen (2009–2012); Tobaku Datenroku Kaiji: One Poker-hen (2013–2017); and Tobaku Datenroku Kaiji: 24 Oku Dasshutsu-hen (since 2017). As of December 2023, the overall Kaiji series has been collected in 91 tankōbon volumes. In North America, the first series was licensed for English release by Denpa, being released in a six-volume omnibus edition, with the first volume published in 2019. Manga Planet also licensed the first series for digital release in 2020.

The first two manga series were adapted into two anime television series of 26 episodes each, produced by Madhouse and broadcast on Nippon TV; Kaiji: Ultimate Survivor aired from October 2007 to April 2008, and Kaiji: Against All Rules aired from April to September 2011. Crunchyroll added both titles to its catalog in 2013, while Sentai Filmworks licensed them in 2020.

Kaiji has also been adapted into a series of live-action films, directed by Tōya Satō and starring Tatsuya Fujiwara as the titular protagonist. The first film, Kaiji, premiered in October 2009; the second film, Kaiji 2, premiered in November 2011; the third film, Kaiji: Final Game, premiered in January 2020; a fourth film, Kaiji: Jinsei Revenge Game, is set to premiere in January 2027. A more loosely adapted Chinese live-action film, titled Animal World, starring Li Yifeng and Michael Douglas, premiered in June 2018. The series has also spawned three spin-off manga series: Mr. Tonegawa, 1-nichi Gaishutsuroku Hanchō, and Jōkyō Seikatsuroku Ichijō.

By October 2023, the Kaiji manga series had over 30 million copies in circulation. In 1998, Gambling Apocalypse: Kaiji received the 22nd Kodansha Manga Award for the general category.

== Plot ==
Japan, February 1996. Three years after graduating high school and moving to Tokyo in search of employment, Kaiji Itō struggles to secure steady work. Consumed by despair, he spends his days in his apartment, indulging in petty pranks, gambling, alcohol, and cigarettes, while obsessing over his financial woes. His life takes a dramatic turn when he is visited by Yūji Endō, a loan shark seeking repayment of a debt Kaiji had co-signed for a former co-worker. Endō presents Kaiji with a choice: either repay the debt over ten years or gamble aboard the ship Espoir (French for 'hope') for one night to settle it. Manipulated by Endō's deceit, Kaiji reluctantly agrees to the gamble, with Endō confident he will never return. However, Kaiji survives the night and is invited to another gambling event at Starside Hotel. Initially hesitant, he is persuaded by his acquaintance, Sahara, to participate. After emerging as the sole survivor of the event, Kaiji seeks to avenge the fallen participants by entering a new gambling match, "E-Card", organized by the shady financing corporation, Teiai Group. Despite losing an ear, he defeats Yukio Tonegawa, Teiai's second-highest executive. Kaiji then wagers his winnings in a high-stakes game against Kazutaka Hyōdō, Teiai's president, but this time loses both his money and four fingers.

After surviving the events at Starside Hotel, with his ear and fingers reattached, Kaiji is left with a debt exceeding ¥9.5 million. He contacts Endō, hoping to participate in another high-stakes gamble, but Endō deceives him, sending him to Teiai's underground labor camp to work off his debt for 15 years. At the camp, Kaiji is initially paid 91,000 perica (equivalent to ¥9,100) per month to dig an underground kingdom, but his earnings are halved to 45,000 perica after losing to Tarō Ōtsuki, a site foreman, in a game of "Underground Cee-lo". Kaiji eventually allies with other "Forty-fivers" (those earning 45,000 perica monthly) to defeat Ōtsuki, and earn enough for a one-day outside pass. Using multiple passes, Kaiji escapes the labor camp with ¥800,000, but has only 20 days to earn ¥60 million to secure his freedom and liberate the other Forty-fivers. He encounters Kōtarō Sakazaki, an indebted man who informs him of a high-stakes pachinko game called "the Bog", located at a Teiai-owned casino. Despite the game being rigged by Seiya Ichijō, the casino manager, to prevent payouts, Kaiji devises a strategy to beat the Bog, and in collaboration with Sakazaki and Endō, they win over ¥700 million. As a result, Ichijō is sentenced to the labor camp for 1,050 years to repay the lost funds. After Kaiji pays off his debt and celebrates his victory, Endō drugs him and confiscates most of his winnings, as repayment of the loan used in his strategy to win the Bog, leaving him only enough money to free the Forty-fivers.

Months after clearing his debt, Kaiji lives with Sakazaki and his family until he is forced to leave with ¥3 million. Kaiji then assists former Forty-fivers Miyoshi and Maeda in challenging a casino president, Takashi Muraoka, at his rigged mahjong game, "Mine Field Game "17 Steps"", with the potential to win over ¥100 million. After losing money, Kaiji discovers the game is manipulated in Muraoka's favor, with Maeda secretly relaying his tiles to Muraoka and Miyoshi sending false signals to Kaiji. Kazuya Hyōdō, son of Kazutaka Hyōdō, loans Kaiji funds to continue playing. Through a stroke of luck, Kaiji eventually defeats Muraoka, winning ¥480 million. Kazuya invites Kaiji to gamble with him, revealing his cynical and ruthless nature, as well as his disdain for humanity. To test his beliefs, Kazuya devises a life-or-death game called the "Salvation Game", involving three indebted friends—Mario, Chang, and Mitsuyama—to determine if their bond is genuine. Kaiji observes the game, urging the trio to defy Kazuya's bleak worldview. However, Mitsuyama ultimately betrays his friends, seizing all the money involved in the game, and abandoning them to their fate. Kaiji intervenes to save Mario and Chang, and before proceeding to a warehouse for his own gamble with Kazuya, he asks them to join and support him in defeating Kazuya.

Kaiji and Kazuya engage in a high-stakes game called "One Poker". After several intense matches—during which Kaiji nearly dies—he ultimately defeats Kazuya. In an act of compassion, Kaiji, aided by Mario and Chang, saves Kazuya from death. While Kazuya remains unconscious, the trio escapes with ¥2.4 billion. Upon discovering what happened, Kazutaka Hyōdō orders his men and Endō to pursue the trio and recover the money. Kaiji, Chang, and Mario evade capture, but soon realize they are being relentlessly hunted by an army of Teiai debtors. Facing constant danger, Kaiji resolves to leave Japan permanently after Chang and Mario return to their respective countries.

== Gambles ==
=== Series 1 ===
Restricted Rock–Paper–Scissors (限定ジャンケン, Gentei Janken)
The gambling tournament aboard the Espoir has a 50% survival rate. Participants receive war funds ranging from ¥1,000,000 to ¥10,000,000 as loans with 1.5% interest compounded every ten minutes during the four-hour voyage. Contestants retaining funds until arrival owe 140% repayment, incentivizing early game completion. Any excess beyond the repayment amount may be kept. The game adapts rock paper scissors using twelve cards (four of each gesture) and three plastic stars as betting collateral. Losing players surrender one star per round. To succeed, contestants must retain all three stars while playing every card. Discarding cards results in immediate disqualification. Matches conclude rapidly, often within seconds. Winners exchange surplus stars for cash in an upstairs lounge, while losing participants are escorted away by staff.
Steel Beam Crossing (鉄骨渡り, Tekkotsu-watari)
The Starside Hotel gamble comprises two stages: Human Derby (人間競馬, Ningen Keiba) and Electrified Steel Beam Crossing (電流鉄骨渡り, Denryū Tekkotsu-watari). Unlike previous challenges, contestants receive no prior explanation of the rules. Participants begin in numbered "coffins" elevated to a platform above a concrete courtyard, where they must cross four narrowing steel beams. The first two finishers win ¥20,000,000 and ¥10,000,000 respectively. Physical contact with the beams results in disqualification, while pushing between contestants is permitted and encouraged for spectator betting purposes. Falls frequently cause severe or fatal injuries. Winners receive time-limited prize coupons redeemable by crossing electrified beams 75 meters above ground. The electric current, while non-lethal, induces stunning that often leads to fatal falls. The challenge's psychological difficulty increases due to a barely visible glass stairway at the endpoint, requiring contestants to make a blind leap to complete the crossing.
E-Card (Eカード, Ī Kādo)
E-Card (Emperor Card) is a simplified social allegory card game featuring three card types: Emperor (皇帝, Kōtei), Citizen (市民, Shimin), and Slave (奴隷, Dorei). The Emperor defeats Citizen, Citizen defeats Slave, and Slave defeats Emperor, mirroring societal power dynamics. Each match pits an Emperor-side player (4 Citizens + 1 Emperor) against a Slave-side player (4 Citizens + 1 Slave). The disadvantaged Slave side receives fivefold winnings due to lower victory odds. The game consists of 12 matches divided into 4 sets of 3 rounds, with players alternating sides. Each round requires playing one card from the five-card hand. When Kaiji lacked sufficient funds, he faced the option of forfeiting an eye or ear as collateral.
Tissue Box Raffle (ティッシュ箱くじ引き, Tisshu Bako Kujibiki)
Unlike the other gambles, this gamble is made by Kaiji himself. After completing E-Card he prepares to leave the hotel but then steps on a tissue box and notices that its sides are open, which he finds fascinating. Upon further investigation of the box Kaiji decides to challenge Hyōdō to a raffle gamble with the tissue box as the container for the lots made of small torn squares of paper towel. The winning piece had a circle drawn on it.

=== Series 2 ===
Underground Cee-lo (地下チンチロ, Chika Chinchiro)
A variation on the dice game, Cee-lo, this game was crafted by Ōtsuki, the foreman of Kaiji's work team in the underground labor camp. Notable rule variations include that the dealer is not fixed and each player can take a turn as dealer. However, each player may opt to pass their turn as dealer, but if they agree to play dealer, then they must be dealer two consecutive times.
Pachinko "The Bog" (パチンコ「沼」, Pachinko "Numa")
An elaborate pachinko game in a high-stakes casino featuring a payout of 100% of the earnings from the machine. Taking this into consideration the house has set up state-of-the-art countermeasures to ensure victory; such as tightening the nails to ensure only 1 in 100 balls go in, using flippers to knock away balls, and tilting the three bottom plates to prevent any balls dropping through the winning holes. Previously only two people have ever beaten the Bog; Hyōdō and Tonegawa. Each ball is worth 1000 times more than a normal pachinko machine, ¥4000 (around $39), but the payout is 100 million balls. When Kaiji first comes across the Bog the jackpot is ¥550 million but when he plays it, the jackpot has risen to over ¥700 million.

=== Series 3 ===
Minefield Game "17 Steps" (地雷ゲーム「17歩」, Jirai Gēmu "17-ho")
A variation of Japanese Mahjong where the game is played by two players who make their best hand from a random draw of 34 tiles. Players do not draw a tile as usual, but instead take turns discarding the 17 leftover tiles from the 34 tiles used to build their hands. Because no tiles are drawn, a hand can only be won by declaring ron on a winning tile discarded by the opponent. A winning hand must reach mangan or higher in order to be valid. If neither player achieves ron after 17 turns, the game becomes a draw, the tiles are reshuffled, and the current wager is doubled.

=== Series 4 ===
Sword Over Love (愛よりも剣, Ai Yori mo Ken)
Kazuya Hyōdō's in-universe novel's gamble features two boxes with fourteen holes each (two in the base, twelve in the body). Participants take turns selecting holes for sword insertion from a pool of nine swords. Nine holes contain protective steel plates, while five unprotected holes inflict leg wounds or fatal torso injuries. The game ends when all swords are used, with mutual survival possible if only protected holes are chosen.
Salvation Game (救出ゲーム, Kyūshitsu Gēmu)
Kazuya Hyōdō's psychological experiment tests three indebted men—Mario (Philippines), Chang (China), and Mitsuyama (Japan)—strapped in tiered seats with light-equipped helmets. Each round designates one savior and two hostages through helmet lights. The savior must release their seatbelt within 30–60 seconds and press a distant button to prevent the hostages' fatal head crushing. The highest participant sees others' lights for advantage. Mid-game reveals the savior gains double the prize for inaction. Kaiji observes, countering Kazuya's cynicism.

=== Series 5 ===
One Poker (ワン・ポーカー, Wan Pōkā)
Kazuya designs this high-stakes card game using two standard decks. Unlike traditional poker, each hand consists of a single card ranked by numerical value alone (suits irrelevant), with a special rule making the weakest card (2) defeat the strongest (ace). Ties occur when cards share equal value. Players begin each round with two cards, playing one while indicator lights reveal whether their options are "up" (higher value) or "down" (lower value). Standard poker betting rules apply, with all cards revealed post-betting regardless of folds. The game occurs atop a tower using Kazuya's mechanical "Mother Sophie" shuffling table. This automated platform moves along tracks toward the losing player's side after each defeat, increasing psychological pressure through physical danger.

=== Films ===
The Princess and the Slave (姫と奴隷, Hime to Dorei)
The live-action film Kaiji 2 features an original gamble called "The Princess and the Slave", replacing Steel Beam Crossing. Inspired by "The Lady, or the Tiger?", the game traps a debt-ridden "slave" in a room with three cages and corresponding buttons. Pressing the correct button releases the slave with ¥30 million, while incorrect choices unleash lethal lions. The slave's companion, the "princess", knows the correct button but may lie, as she receives ¥3 million if the slave dies. Though the princess has little financial incentive to betray the slave—since most winnings would go toward debt repayment—the slave must still discern the truth of her instructions to survive.
Tower of Babel (バベルの塔, Baberu no Tō)
An original game that appears in the live-action film Kaiji: Final Game. Participants compete for cards stuck to the tops of poles erected around the city.
Dream Jump (ドリームジャンプ, Dorīmu Janpu)
An original game that appears in the live-action film Kaiji: Final Game. Players select one of the ten ropes and get dropped in a bungee jumping fashion. There is a one-in-ten chance that the person who picked the right rope will be able to survive, but the others will fall from a high ground to their deaths.
Final Judgment – The Human Scale (最後の審判 -人間秤-, Saigo no Shinpan Ningen Bakari)
The live-action film Kaiji: Final Game introduces an original competition where rival participants convert their entire wealth into gold bars for measurement on a scale. Players recruit supporters categorized as "Friends", "Fixers", or "Family"—individuals who transform assets (cash, artwork, property deeds) into additional gold bars using advanced grading equipment. Spectators participate as "Fans" by casting numbered gold coins onto their predicted winner's scale. Correct predictions double the winning side's total, while coins failing to land on scales are forfeited to Teiai. The game's central strategy involves persuading opponents' supporters to defect during the competition.
Gold Rock Paper Scissors (ゴールドジャンケン, Gōrudo Janken)
An original game that appears in the live-action film Kaiji: Final Game. This is a gamble that Kōsuke Takakura frequently plays for entertainment purposes, with the rules not deviating much from those of a normal rock paper scissors game, but the player must hold a handful of solid gold in one of the three rounds of the game, which means they must play Rock in at least one of those rounds. If the player holds the gold and wins with Rock, they can get that gold as a bonus.

== Production ==
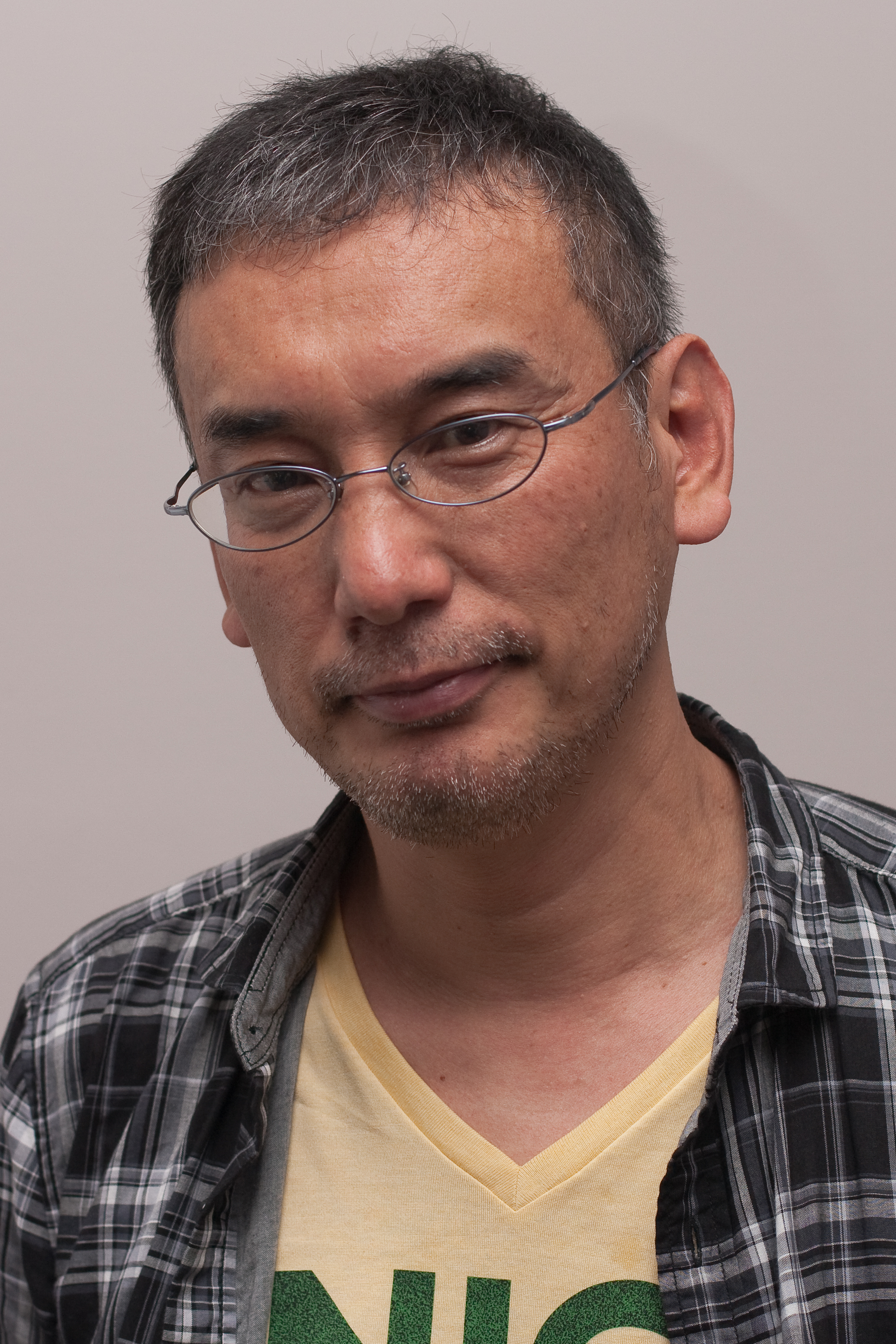
Nobuyuki Fukumoto, the author of Kaiji

Before the start of the series, Nobuyuki Fukumoto was 37 years old and had an established reputation for his gambling manga, including works such as Ten, Akagi, and Gin to Kin. The project was initially conceived as a short story centered on the first game in the series, "Restricted Rock–Paper–Scissors". However, Fukumoto informed his chief editor at Kodansha that compressing the narrative into a few chapters proved difficult. Consequently, the decision to serialize the manga was made in November 1995, and Kaiji started publication in Weekly Young Magazine in February 1996. Fukumoto noted that the original concept did not use the main character's name as the title. He intended to avoid making the protagonist "so cool" and sought the most ordinary name possible for him.

Assuming his readers might be unfamiliar with gambling manga, Fukumoto stated that he created original gambling games for the series. He found that invented games are easier to process than pre-existing ones, allowing for simpler rules and greater creative freedom. He noted that any scenario can become a gamble, and an original game enables him to craft surprising or interesting developments for the audience. His process for creating a new game involves first devising the concept and then figuring out a method to defeat it, emphasizing that persistence is key to developing clever tricks and creative solutions for victory.

An example of Fukumoto's technique of conveying characters' emotions through exaggerated visual expressions

Kaiji, like most of Fukumoto's works, is drawn in a cartoonish and loose style. He employs techniques such as distorting characters' eyeballs and faces to express intense emotions. The titular character is drawn with sharper features: an angular face, pointed chin, and sharp nose, which makes freehand drawing difficult. Fukumoto uses a ruler and rotates the manuscript paper to illustrate him accurately. For antagonists, Fukumoto emphasizes their "ugliness" by rendering a frightening look in their eyes and prominent, threatening teeth. A trademark of his style is the use of the onomatopoeia zawa... (ざわ…) to convey a character's uneasiness. Visual metaphors, such as depicting Kaiji jumping over a large crevice or being swept away in a torrent of water, are also used to express tense atmospheres. Female characters rarely appear in the series, with Mikoko Sakazaki being the most prominent; they are especially uncommon in gambling scenes, as Fukumoto has stated that women are unnecessary in the gambling world. Nevertheless, in July 2019, Fukumoto began Yami-ma no Mamiya, a gambling mahjong manga series featuring a female protagonist.

The manga explores human psychology in extreme situations, with characters navigating betrayal and elaborate cons while desperately seeking a path to victory. Fukumoto has expressed that he cannot create manga where characters easily form life-risking friendships; his protagonists are consistently isolated, without friends or followers, and Kaiji himself is frequently betrayed. Fukumoto considered antagonists like Kazutaka Hyōdō and Yukio Tonegawa to be villains who speak cruel truths. By having Kaiji reflect on his life and recognize his own flaws, Fukumoto framed the story as one of maturation. His intention was to depict a character who undergoes change and gains the capacity to trust others, despite previous betrayals.

The sixth part of the series, Tobaku Datenroku Kaiji: 24 Oku Dasshutsu-hen, went on hiatus in June 2023. In March 2024, Fukumoto revealed that it would end soon, and that the following arc would be the last one of the series.

== Media ==
=== Manga ===
Written and illustrated by Nobuyuki Fukumoto, the Kaiji manga started its serialization in Kodansha's seinen manga magazine Weekly Young Magazine on February 19, 1996. (Note: Gambling Apocalypse: Kaiji started in the magazine's 11th issue of 1996, released on February 19 of that same year.) The manga franchise is divided into six main series:

- Gambling Apocalypse: Kaiji (賭博黙示録カイジ, Tobaku Mokushiroku Kaiji) (1996–1999, 13 volumes)
- Tobaku Hakairoku Kaiji (賭博破戒録カイジ; lit. 'Gambling Apostasy: Kaiji') (2000–2004, 13 volumes)
- Tobaku Datenroku Kaiji (賭博堕天録カイジ; lit. 'Gambling Outcast: Kaiji') (2004–2008, 13 volumes)
- Tobaku Datenroku Kaiji: Kazuya-hen (賭博堕天録カイジ 和也編; lit. 'Gambling Outcast: Kaiji – Kazuya Arc') (2009–2012, 10 volumes)
- Tobaku Datenroku Kaiji: One Poker-hen (賭博堕天録カイジ ワン・ポーカー編, Tobaku Datenroku Kaiji Wan Pōkā-hen; lit. 'Gambling Outcast: Kaiji – One Poker Arc') (2013–2017, 16 volumes)
- Tobaku Datenroku Kaiji: 24 Oku Dasshutsu-hen (賭博堕天録カイジ 24億脱出編; lit. 'Gambling Outcast: Kaiji – 2.4 Billion Escape Arc') (2017–present, 26 volumes)

In August 2018, it was announced at Otakon that the then-new North American manga publishing company, Denpa, licensed the first manga series, Gambling Apocalypse: Kaiji. It is being released in a six-volume omnibus edition with over 500 pages each, and the first volume was published on December 10, 2019. In June 2020, Manga Planet announced the digital English-language publication of the manga; it was planned to start on June 23 of that same year; however, it was postponed to November 18. The platform shut down its digital service on March 31, 2026. Gambling Apocalypse Kaiji was added to the Crunchyroll Manga service in January 2026.

==== Spin-offs and related works ====
A spin-off, titled Mr. Tonegawa: Middle Management Blues (中間管理録トネガワ, Chūkan Kanriroku Tonegawa), written by Tensei Hagiwara and illustrated by Tomohiro Hashimoto and Tomoki Miyoshi, was serialized in Kodansha's Monthly Young Magazine from June 20, 2015, to January 23, 2018. The manga was transferred to the Comic Days manga app on March 5, 2018. The series finished on June 8, 2020.

A second spin-off series, titled 1-nichi Gaishutsuroku Hanchō (1日外出録ハンチョウ; lit. 'One Day Outing Foreman'), written by Hagiwara and illustrated by Motomu Uehara and Kazuya Arai, started in Weekly Young Magazine on December 26, 2016.

A third spin-off series, titled Jōkyō Seikatsuroku Ichijō (上京生活録イチジョウ; lit. 'Ichijō's Life in Tokyo'), written by Hagiwara and illustrated by Tomoki Miyoshi and Yoshiaki Seto, started in Kodansha's Morning on January 21, 2021, and finished on January 12, 2023.

A manga story by Fukumoto, titled Espoir Mae Kaiji (エスポワール前 カイジ, Esupowāru Mae Kaiji; lit. 'Kaiji Before the Espoir'), focused on Kaiji before boarding the ship Espoir, was published in the first issue of Young Magazine's supplement magazine, Young Magazine Kakehiki, on April 22, 2024.

=== Anime ===
In August 2007, Weekly Young Magazine announced an anime television series adaptation of the first manga series. Titled Kaiji: Ultimate Survivor (逆境無頼カイジ Ultimate Survivor, Gyakkyō Burai Kaiji Arutimetto Sabaibā; lit. 'The Suffering Pariah Kaiji: Ultimate Survivor'), produced by Nippon Television, D.N. Dream Partners, VAP and Madhouse, the series was directed by Yuzo Sato, with Hideo Takayashiki handling series composition and Haruhito Takada designing the characters. It ran for 26 episodes from October 3, 2007, to April 2, 2008, on Nippon TV. (Note: Nippon TV listed the air dates for Kaiji: Ultimate Survivor on Tuesday at 24:59, which is effectively Wednesday at 0:59 a.m. JST.) The episodes were collected into nine DVDs released by VAP between January 23 and September 26, 2008. VAP later released all the episodes on a DVD box set on October 7, 2009.

A second season with the same key staff, titled Kaiji: Against All Rules (逆境無頼カイジ 破戒録篇, Gyakkyō Burai Kaiji Hakairoku-hen; lit. 'The Suffering Pariah Kaiji: Backslide Arc'), was announced by Weekly Young Magazine in January 2011. Based on the second manga series, Tobaku Hakairoku Kaiji, it ran for 26 episodes on Nippon TV from April 6 to September 28, 2011. (Note: Nippon TV listed the air dates for Kaiji: Against All Rules on Tuesday at 24:59, which is effectively Wednesday at 0:59 a.m. JST.) A scene depicting Kaiji throwing himself into large-stakes gambling by symbolically drawing him into a rushing torrent of water was replaced due to the 2011 Tōhoku earthquake and tsunami, which occurred midway through the anime's production (Fukumoto donated 30 million yen (US$360,000) to the quake victims). The episodes were collected into nine DVDs released by VAP between June 22, 2011, and February 22, 2012. VAP also released all the episodes on two DVD box sets on September 21, 2011, and February 22, 2012.

==== English release ====
In the United States, Kaiji: Ultimate Survivor was streamed on the Joost service in December 2008. In July 2013, Crunchyroll announced the streaming rights to both seasons. In November 2020, Sentai Filmworks announced the license of both seasons for streaming on select digital outlets and home video release. Both seasons were released in Japanese with English subtitles on a Blu-ray Disc set on April 20, 2021. In December 2021, Sentai Filmworks posted on Twitter a video with their ADR director Kyle Jones "accidentally" teasing that an English dub was in production for the series, with plans for a 2022 release. The English dub for the first nine episodes of Kaiji: Ultimate Survivor premiered on Hidive on November 28, 2022; episodes 10–15 premiered on February 21, 2023; and episodes 16–26 premiered on August 4 of the same year. A Blu-ray Disc set containing all episodes of Kaiji: Ultimate Survivor, with both the English dub and the original Japanese audio with English subtitles, was released on December 10, 2024.

Anime Limited released Kaiji: Ultimate Survivor and Kaiji: Against All Rules on "Collector's Blu-ray" editions in the United Kingdom and Ireland on December 18, 2023, and September 16, 2024, respectively; the regular editions of both seasons were released on June 17 and September 16, 2024, respectively.

=== Music ===
The music for the anime series was composed by Hideki Taniuchi. The original soundtrack album for Kaiji: Ultimate Survivor was released by VAP on January 23, 2008. The original soundtrack album for Kaiji: Against All Rules was released on July 20, 2011.

The opening theme for Kaiji: Ultimate Survivor is a cover of the Blue Hearts' song "Mirai wa Bokura no te no Naka" (未来は僕らの手の中; lit. 'The Future is in Our Hands'), by Masato Hagiwara (credited as Kaiji) with Red Bonchiris, (Note: Kaiji uizu Reddo Bonchirīzu (カイジ with レッどぼんチリーず). Bonchiris (ぼんチリーず, Bonchirīzu) refers to Bonchiri (ボンチリ), which is the tail of a chicken, also called "triangle" because of its shape, used to prepare yakitori.) and the ending theme is "Makeinu-tachi no Requiem" (負け犬達のレクイエム, Makeinu-tachi no Rekuiemu; lit. 'Requiem of the Cowardly Losers'), written, composed and performed by Hakuryu, who also voiced Yukio Tonegawa in the series.

The opening theme for Kaiji: Against All Rules is "Chase the Light!" by Fear, and Loathing in Las Vegas, and the ending theme is "C Kara Hajimaru ABC" (CからはじまるABC; lit. 'ABCs That Start from C') by Wasureranneyo.

=== Live-action films ===
Kaiji has been adapted into a series of live-action films directed by Tōya Satō and starring Tatsuya Fujiwara as Kaiji Itō. The first film, Kaiji, was announced in October 2008. It premiered on October 10, 2009. In the UK, the first film was released on DVD by 4Digital Media under the title Kaiji: The Ultimate Gambler on July 26, 2010.

A sequel, Kaiji 2, was announced in November 2009. It was released on November 5, 2011. Both films differ from the manga and anime series in that they depict different choices Kaiji made. However, they all share the same settings, events in different orders, and rule changes in each gamble.

In May 2019, a third film, titled Kaiji: Final Game, with a completely original story by Fukumoto, was announced to premiere on January 10, 2020. A novelization of the film by Van Madoy was released on November 14, 2019.

In June 2026, a fourth film, titled Kaiji: Jinsei Revenge Game, was announced to premiere on January 29, 2027. Masatoshi Yamaguchi wrote the film's script with assistance from Fukumoto.

A more loosely adapted Chinese live-action movie, Animal World, starring Li Yifeng and Michael Douglas, was released on June 29, 2018, in China and other countries. Netflix acquired the global digital rights to the film.

=== Video games ===
Tobaku Mokushiroku Kaiji (賭博黙示録カイジ), developed by Kodansha, was released for the PlayStation on May 25, 2000. Gyakkyō Burai Kaiji – Death or Survival (逆境無頼カイジ Death or Survival), developed by Compile Heart, was released for the Nintendo DS on September 25, 2008. A PlayStation VR game, titled Kaiji VR: Zetsubō no Tekkotsu Watari (カイジVR～絶望の鉄骨渡り～), was released on August 28, 2017. The game is developed by Solid Sphere and is based on the events depicted in the Castle of Despair arc of the first part of the manga. A version of the game was also launched for the Nintendo Switch on December 28, 2017.

Several pachinko and pachislot machines based on the series have been released. Rodeo has launched three pachislots: Kaidō Mokushiroku Kaiji (回胴黙示録カイジ) in October 2004, Kaidō Mokushiroku Kaiji 2 (回胴黙示録カイジ2) in December 2008, and Kaidō Mokushiroku Kaiji 3 (回胴黙示録カイジ3) in September 2013. Sammy launched the pachislot Kaidō Mokushiroku Kaiji 4 (回胴黙示録カイジ4) in December 2018. Takao have released multiple pachinko machines. The first, CR Dan-kyū Mokushiroku Kaiji (CR弾球黙示録カイジ), in 2007, the second, CR Dan-kyū Mokushiroku Kaiji Numa (CR弾球黙示録カイジ沼), in 2009, the third, CR Dan-kyū Mokushiroku Kaiji 2 (CR弾球黙示録カイジ2), in 2011, the fourth, CR Dan-kyū Mokushiroku Kaiji Numa 2 (CR弾球黙示録カイジ 沼2), in 2012, the fifth, CR Dan-kyū Mokushiroku Kaiji 3 (CR弾球黙示録カイジ3) in 2014, the sixth, CR Dan-kyū Mokushiroku Kaiji Numa 3 (CR弾球黙示録カイジ沼3) in 2017, the seventh, CR Dan-kyū Mokushiroku Kaiji HIGH & LOW (CR弾球黙示録カイジHIGH&LOW), in 2018, and the eighth, P-Numa (P沼), also released in 2018.

Kaiji was featured in Level-5's game Girl's RPG Cinderellife, launched for Nintendo 3DS in 2012. Kaiji and Mikoko Sakazaki were featured in a promotional collaboration for the massively multiplayer online role-playing game (MMORPG) Monster Hunter Frontier G in 2016.

=== Stage show ===
A stage adaptation of the Restricted Rock–Paper–Scissors and Steel Beam Crossing arcs of the manga starring Taiki Yamazaki as Kaiji was announced on September 30, 2020, and ran from December 4 to 6 of the same year at Kyoto Theater, and then from December 10 to 13 at Hulic Hall Tokyo. It was directed by Akira Yamazaki and written by Azuki Mashiba, with Yutaka Narui serving as script supervisor. Fumihiko Tachiki, the narrator for the anime adaptations, reprised his role for the show.

=== Other media ===
A guidebook, titled Overwhelming Official Guide Kaiji × Kaiji × Kaiji (圧倒的オフィシャルガイド カイジ×カイジ×カイジ, Attōteki Ofisharu Gaido Kaiji × Kaiji × Kaiji), was published by Kodansha on October 28, 2011. It includes complete information about the series's first fifteen years of serialization. It also includes a one-shot "chapter 0", titled "Kaiji Side Story: Death By Indignation" (カイジ外伝「憤死」, Kaiji Gaiden: Funshi), originally published in the 12th issue of Young Magazine Zōkan: Aka Buta in 1997, and depicts a "what if" scenario where Kaiji chooses not to accept Endō's offer to board the Espoir.

Good Smile Company launched a figma figure of Kaiji Itō in August 2011. A Nendoroid figure of Kaiji was released in November 2024.

In August 2011, when Kaiji reached its 500th chapter, Weekly Young Magazine published tribute illustrations by other manga artists to celebrate Fukumoto's manga achievement, including Clamp, Tetsuya Chiba, Naoki Urasawa, Shuichi Shigeno, George Morikawa, Keisuke Itagaki, Hideo Yamamoto, and 12 others.

A Japanese variety show, titled Jinsei Gyakuten Battle Kaiji (人生逆転バトル カイジ; 'Kaiji: The Gambling Life-and-Death Swindle'), aired on TBS in December 2017. On the show, contestants in debt had the opportunity to earn money by participating in challenges inspired by the games featured in the manga. The program's official website offered an application process until November 2017. Another variety show with the same topic, titled Real Kaiji Grand Prix (リアルカイジGP), was streamed in AbemaTV's AbemaSPECIAL Channel in April 2018.

An art exhibition, Gyakkyō Kaiko-roku Dai Kaiji-ten (逆境回顧録 大カイジ展; lit. 'Adversity Retrospective: The Great Kaiji Exhibition'), was held at the Gallery AaMo in Tokyo Dome City in Tokyo from March 16 to May 12, 2024.

A board lottery game, Ichibankuji Kuji Naraku-roku Kaiji (一番くじ 鬮奈落録カイジ; lit. 'First Prize Lottery Kaiji: The Record of the Lottery'), featuring gambling-themed games that appear in the first series, was released by Bandai Spirits on July 24, 2025.

== Reception ==
=== General reception ===
==== Manga and anime ====
The manga had 18 million copies in circulation by November 2011; over 20 million copies in circulation by July 2012; over 21.5 million copies in circulation by January 2019; and over 30 million copies by October 2023. Individual volumes have been featured in Oricon's weekly charts of best-selling manga every year from 2009 through 2018. Kaiji is a popular series in Japan, and like Fukumoto's other work, Akagi, it has a cult following overseas.

In 1998, along with Sōten Kōro, Gambling Apocalypse: Kaiji won the 22nd Kodansha Manga Award in the general category.

In 2015, an online poll was conducted by Japanese website Goo on the "Best Cerebral Anime", where Kaiji ranked second, behind Death Note.

==== Live-action films ====
At the Japanese box office, the first Kaiji film grossed ¥2.25 billion ($24.05 million); Kaiji 2 grossed ¥1.61 billion ($20.17 million); and Kaiji: Final Game grossed ¥2.06 billion ($19.29 million). Overseas, the first film grossed $460,073, and the second film $68,175 in Singapore. The Chinese film adaptation Animal World grossed CN¥510 million ($77.09 million) in China.

In 2015, Goo conducted an online poll on "Live-Action Manga/Anime Adaptations That Worked", and the first Kaiji film ranked sixth out of 38 adaptations.

=== Critical reception ===
Michael Toole of Anime News Network (ANN) praised the narrative of Kaiji, describing the series as "run through with entertaining lowlifes, odd situations, and intoxicating moments of suspense." Bradley Meek of THEM Anime Reviews called Kaiji one of the most unique anime he had seen, lauding its ingenious games as devilishly clever and reliant on player psychology as much as strategy. Meek identified the main theme of the series as the exploitation of the poor by the rich, viewing the games as a form of direct social commentary. David Smith of IGN commended the development of the games' rules and strategies, but he found the titular protagonist's repeated falls into obvious traps to be frustrating. Regarding the tone of the series, Theron Martin of ANN wrote that the first episode of its second season oscillates between being a psychological character study and clinically depressing, which could be off-putting, and noted that the series targets an older male audience. Gia Manry of the same website ranked the titular character second on her list of "Anime Characters with Terrible Karma." In comparing Kaiji to other gambling series such as Fukumoto's Akagi, Shinobu Kaitani's One Outs, and Fūmei Sai and Yasushi Hoshino's The Legend of the Gambler: Tetsuya, John Oppliger of AnimeNation considered that Kaiji appeals to a wider audience due to its variety of high-stakes games rather than focusing on a single type, and because the aforementioned series featured prodigies rather than ordinary protagonists. However, he stated that viewers seeking skilled gamesmanship might be disappointed by Kaiji's extensive reliance on coincidence, deus ex machina, and authorial manipulation, which substitute for intelligence and strategy. Norbert Daniels Jr. of ANN wrote that Kaiji's story should resonate with American millennials and help them understand their common plight with the Lost Generation of Japan, adding that the series conveys that solidarity leads to eventual success, echoing the show's message that the future lies in one's hands. Chris Beveridge of The Fandom Post described Kaiji as entertaining in small doses, praising its inventive gambling matches, interesting cast of characters, and intense situations.

Although reviewers have described the series's art style as "ugly" and "heavily stylized", they nevertheless found it fitting to the overall tone of the story

The art style of the series received particular attention from reviewers. Toole described Kaiji: Ultimate Survivor as "fantastically ugly" and "cheaply animated," and Martin stated that it employed a very old-school artistic style, noting prominent noses, extra-heavy lines in character designs, and limited animation; in another article, Martin said that the simplicity of the animation was clearly calculated and heavily stylized due to Fukumoto's original art style. God Len of Japanator wrote that the artwork was unique, with long noses, misshapen heads, and unsettling teeth, but that this aesthetic worked for Kaiji due to its consistency and the premise that gamblers were meant to be ugly. Daryl Surat of Otaku USA commented that Fukumoto's exaggerated facial expressions and contortions effectively conveyed the emotional peaks and valleys inherent in gambling matters of life, death, and large sums of money. He also highlighted Fukumoto's trademark sound effect "Zawa Zawa" to denote unease, and the highly talkative narrator who explained the significance of events with gravitas, bombast, and wild metaphor realized through outlandish fantasy visuals. David Cabrera of Polygon commented on the oppressive atmosphere of the series and stated that Fukumoto had a gift for presenting the abstract terror of staking one's life on a coin flip, wringing maximum suspense from each turn and delving into characters' thoughts as they faced the unthinkable. Cabrera added that Kaiji himself was key to the series's engagement, explaining that he is cowardly, quick to tears, and prone to error when comfortable, but he becomes sympathetic when backed into a corner.

TechRadar included Kaiji among its list of "31 fantastic anime series" and called it a high bar for the niche subgenre of gambling anime. They added that Kaiji's flaws made him an unlikely but sympathetic protagonist, heightening tension as he was forced into desperate gambles and psychological battles, and that the show had much to say about class, privilege, and the self-destructive nature of hope. Crunchyroll listed the second season Kaiji: Against All Rules among the best anime series of 2011; reviewer Joseph Luster commented that the series was dangerously addictive and expressed a desire for its greater popularity in North America.

== Legacy ==
Manga author Homura Kawamoto, writer of Kakegurui, stated that Kaiji served as an influence to his series. South Korean film director and writer Hwang Dong-hyuk mentioned that Kaiji served as an inspiration for the 2021 television series Squid Game.

== See also ==
- Gambling in Japan
