= Kaiji: Ultimate Survivor =

- DVD box set cover
- No. of episodes: 26

Release
- Original network: Nippon TV
- Original release: October 3, 2007 – April 2, 2008

Season chronology
- Next → Kaiji: Against All Rules

Kaiji: Ultimate Survivor is a Japanese anime television series, based on Gambling Apocalypse: Kaiji, the first part of the manga series Kaiji by Nobuyuki Fukumoto. Produced by Nippon Television, D.N. Dream Partners, VAP and Madhouse, the series was directed by Yuzo Sato, with Hideo Takayashiki handling series composition, Haruhito Takada designing the characters and Hideki Taniuchi composing the music. The story centers on Kaiji Itō, an impoverished young man, and his misadventures around gambling.

The anime was announced by Kodansha's Weekly Young Magazine in 2007. The series was broadcast on Nippon TV from October 3, 2007, and April 2, 2008. (Note: Nippon TV listed the air dates for Kaiji: Ultimate Survivor on Tuesday at 24:59, which is effectively Wednesday at 0:59 a.m. JST.) Its 26 episodes were collected into nine DVDs, released by VAP between January 23 and September 26, 2008. VAP re-released all the episodes on a DVD box set on October 7, 2009. The opening theme is a cover of the Blue Hearts' song "Mirai wa Bokura no te no Naka" (未来は僕らの手の中; "The Future is in Our Hands"), by Masato Hagiwara (credited as Kaiji) with Red Bonchiris, (Note: Kaiji uizu Reddo Bonchirīzu (カイジ with レッどぼんチリーず). Bonchirīzu (ぼんチリーず) refers to Bonchiri (ボンチリ), which is the tail of a chicken, also called "triangle" because of its shape, used to prepare yakitori.) and the ending theme is "Makeinu-tachi no Requiem" (負け犬達のレクイエム, Makeinu-tachi no Rekuiemu; "Requiem of the Cowardly Losers"), written, composed and performed by Hakuryu.

In the United States, Kaiji: Ultimate Survivor was streamed on the Joost service in December 2008. In July 2013, Crunchyroll announced the streaming rights to the series. In November 2020, Sentai Filmworks announced that they have licensed the series for streaming on select digital outlets and home video release. It was released in Japanese with English subtitles on Blu-ray Disc on April 20, 2021. An English dub for the first nine episodes premiered on Hidive on November 28, 2022; episodes 10–15 premiered on February 21, 2023; and episodes 16–26 premiered on August 4 of the same year. A Blu-ray Disc set containing all episodes of Kaiji: Ultimate Survivor, with both the English dub and the original Japanese audio with English subtitles, was released on December 10, 2024. Anime Limited released a "Collector's Blu-ray" edition of Kaiji: Ultimate Survivor in the United Kingdom and Ireland on December 18, 2023.

== Episodes ==
No.	Title	Directed by	Written by	Storyboarded by	Original release date
1	"Departure"; Transliteration: "Shukkō" (Japanese: 出航)	Nanako Shimazaki	Hideo Takayashiki	Tomihiko Ōkubo	October 3, 2007
Kaiji Itō is a loser and gambler living in poverty. One day he is approached by a loan shark named Yūji Endō, who tells Kaiji that he owes ¥3,850,000 (around $37,500) for guaranteeing a loan with a former co-worker who has disappeared. Endō gives Kaiji the option of trying to earn all the money to repay the debt quickly by participating in an unknown gambling event on a ship called Espoir. Kaiji reluctantly agrees.
2	"Open Fire"; Transliteration: "Hibuta" (Japanese: 火蓋)	Ryōsuke Nakamura	Hideo Takayashiki	Yuzo Sato	October 10, 2007
Aboard the Espoir, Kaiji finds himself with hundreds of people who also have debts. "Restricted Rock Paper Scissors" is announced as the gambling event that will be played by Kaiji and the other debtors on board the ship. It is informed to everyone that losers in this game will be forced into manual labor for years. After a cursory explanation of the rules, Kaiji is approached by a man named Jōji Funai who convinces Kaiji to team up with him to beat the system. However, he tricks Kaiji out of two of his stars.
3	"Wager"; Transliteration: "Shōbu" (Japanese: 勝負)	Shigetaka Ikeda	Mitsutaka Hirota	Shigetaka Ikeda	October 17, 2007
Trapped in the depths of despair after being tricked by Funai, Kaiji meets the former co-worker who got him into debt, Takeshi Furuhata. Initially mad at Furuhata, Kaiji teams up with him and finds another person to join their team named Mamoru Andō, who is also in a tight spot with 2 stars but no more cards to play with. Andō tricks Furuhata into giving him a card which he then uses to play and loses another star. Kaiji insists they stay together and comes up with another plan to win, but they need to bait someone in order to win more stars for the group. They find a player who has many stars and cards, and Kaiji manages to win 2 stars from him.
4	"Failure"; Transliteration: "Hatan" (Japanese: 破綻)	Park Jin-kyeong; Oyunam (assistant)	Kazuyuki Fudeyasu	Shigetaka Ikeda	October 24, 2007
Kaiji gives the 2 stars he won to his partners and begins to think strategically about how to win 4 more stars with only ¥14 million (around $136,500) and no cards. Kaiji comes up with a plan to monopolize the game by first acquiring 30 Rock cards, then acquiring enough stars and also make a profit. However, another group thought of the same strategy and they target Andō and Furuhata who each lose a star. Kaiji then challenges Kitami, the leader of the group, to a "death match" where the winner takes all.
5	"Deadly Decision"; Transliteration: "Kesshi" (Japanese: 決死)	Masahiro Hosoda	Tadao Iwaki	Masahiro Hosoda	October 31, 2007
Kaiji challenges Kitami to a Rock Paper Scissors death match, but Kitami refuses to accept. Kaiji pressures Kitami until he finally accepts the challenge for a wager of 3 stars. Kaiji calculates that Kitami wants to get rid of 1 extra card and successfully guesses which card he has and beats him, winning 3 stars. He then hatches a plan of buying out all 30 Paper cards held by the Kitami group.
6	"Rise and Fall"; Transliteration: "Kōbō" (Japanese: 興亡)	Kim Min-sun; Oyunam (assistant)	Hideo Takayashiki	Tomihiko Ōkubo	November 7, 2007
Kaiji succeeds with his plan of buying out the Kitami group's 30 Paper cards. Funai later approaches Kaiji with a deal to trade his star for some of Kaiji cards, but Kaiji refuses. With only 14 minutes to go, the remaining players do not trust each other, and information on everyone's cards is being leaked. Funai proposes to everyone that they should reshuffle their cards, an idea that will completely ruin Kaiji's plan.
7	"Proclamation"; Transliteration: "Kappa" (Japanese: 喝破)	Nanako Shimazaki	Mitsutaka Hirota	Nanako Shimazaki	November 14, 2007
The Restricted Rock Paper Scissors gambling event is nearing its end and Kaiji's group is forced to join Funai's idea of reshuffling all the cards among the remaining 13 participants. However Funai spills Kaiji's cards, delaying Kaiji's group while they gather them, leaving few to play against. Kaiji then accuses Funai of cheating and manipulating the card distribution, which causes the others to refuse to play against him. With only 4 other players left in the game, Kaiji then comes up with a risky plan to play off against the first 3 and loses 1 star. However, he now prepares to challenge Funai who is holding 9 stars.
8	"Crushing Blow"; Transliteration: "Tettsui" (Japanese: 鉄槌)	Yoshifumi Sueda	Kazuyuki Fudeyasu	Toshiyuki Tsuru	November 21, 2007
There are only 5 minutes to go in the game and only Funai is left with a card, so Kaiji challenges him to a final match, wagering the 5 stars held by his group. Kaiji has the edge because he knows that either way he will be sent to the "other room" because they have an uneven number of cards. Funai is reluctant to accept the unfair wager, but has no choice. After winning, Kaiji gives the 5 new stars and remaining money to Furuhata and Andō, trusting that they will bail him out in a final buy-sell period. Kaiji is then taken away, stripped naked and placed in a darkened room with all the other losers.
9	"Resurrection"; Transliteration: "Kaisei" (Japanese: 回生)	Kenichi Kawamura	Hideo Takayashiki	Hiroshi Aoyama	November 28, 2007
Kaiji waits in the other room to be rescued by his comrades, however Andō betrays Kaiji by selling his extra star and it does not take long for Furuhata to desert him as well. Kaiji picks a fight with another loser, Okabayashi, who has a bandage on his shoulder. Okabayashi leaves, hoping to buy his way out, but without realizing that Kaiji stole the bandage containing valuable jewelry. Kaiji uses the jewelry to buy his way out, then confronts his former allies Furuhata and Andō. With his new wealth, Kaiji buys the freedom of another man, Kōji Ishida, and rants against their exploitation. After the 4 hours, only 67 of the 103 participants return to the streets, many now with fresh debts.
10	"Messenger"; Transliteration: "Shisha" (Japanese: 使者)	Hiroyuki Tanaka	Mitsutaka Hirota	Toshiya Niidome	December 5, 2007
Kaiji was able to survive the Restricted Rock-Paper-Scissors event, but is left with a new debt of ¥6,295,000 (around $61,400). Four months later, Kaiji is working at a convenience store, still in debt and poverty. He is even accused of stealing money which was in fact stolen by his co-worker, Makoto Sahara. One night, Endō again appears before Kaiji, offering him a chance to clear his debt in one night of gambling.
11	"Revelry"; Transliteration: "Kyōen" (Japanese: 狂宴)	Shigetaka Ikeda	Kazuyuki Fudeyasu	Shigetaka Ikeda	December 12, 2007
Kaiji accepts the invitation to the next gambling event at Starside Hotel. There, he sees Ishida and Sahara, and recognizes a few familiar faces from the Espoir, but decides he has no friends there, only competitors. Kaiji is really determined to win, but the gambling event this time is a dangerous game. The event is called "Human Derby", where the entrants must cross a high, narrow beam to reach their goal of ¥20 million while spectators below gamble on who will win. Soon, the contestants realize they must push the one in front of them off the beam to win.
12	"Plunge"; Transliteration: "Tenraku" (Japanese: 転落)	Masahiro Hosoda	Hideo Takayashiki	Tomihiko Ōkubo	December 19, 2007
Kaiji decides not to push the player in front of him to win, but is disqualified after he falls and grabs onto the beam. Sahara wins and Ishida comes second. By the end of the Human Derby, only 21 people out of the total 60 contestants remained to continue, however, they must now participate in "Electrified Steel Beam Crossing", a game in which they must cross an electrified beam bridge 22 stories above the ground to collect their winnings or, like Kaiji, compete for one remaining bonus ticket. When Sahara complains, the organizer Yukio Tonegawa tells them that it is just another way of their wasted lives to earn money, instead of years of working. Tonegawa then calls for volunteers to try their luck.
13	"Monster"; Transliteration: "Kaibutsu" (Japanese: 怪物)	Ryōsuke Nakamura	Mitsutaka Hirota	Ryōsuke Nakamura	December 26, 2007
Ten people including Kaiji volunteer to cross the electrified beam bridge. After being given the order in which they will cross, Kaiji inspires them to be confident and succeed. With their morale lifted, they begin to cross the beams despite being racked with fear. As they cross, the demon of fear grabs hold of them and they become silent. Kaiji tries his best to keep them going, but two of them soon fall to their deaths.
14	"Ghost"; Transliteration: "Bōrei" (Japanese: 亡霊)	Yoshifumi Sueda	Kazuyuki Fudeyasu	Tetsurō Araki	January 9, 2008
At the Starside Hotel event, 8 people now remain to participate in the deadly Electrified Steel Beam Crossing gamble. Faced with death, they all want to give up but Tonegawa ignores their pleas of mercy to cut the electricity within the beams in exchange for money. He considers that the contestants have already thrown their lives away by wasting it on idleness and gambling, and surmises that if they survive, they may benefit from this real life-challenging experience. After a mere 3 minutes, only Kaiji, Sahara and Ishida remain, but Ishida loses his nerve and hands his ticket to Kaiji to give to his wife before silently falling to his death. Panicking, Sahara runs the last few meters and reaches the other side.
15	"Heavens"; Transliteration: "Tenkū" (Japanese: 天空)	Nanako Shimazaki	Hideo Takayashiki	Nanako Shimazaki	January 16, 2008
Sahara is the first to survive the Electrified Steel Beam Crossing gamble but is unable to open the window, while Kaiji sees what appears to be people laughing at Sahara from the inside. Sahara forces the window open, but the internal air pressure blows him backwards and he falls to his death. Fortunately, Kaiji sees an almost invisible glass staircase beside the beam. He suspects that it may be a trap, but steps onto it and realizes that he has won, the only survivor. However, Tonegawa declares his ticket void because he cut the power in the beams in exchange for the money, but cruelly delayed the process and did not tell the participants. The chairman of the Teiai Group intervenes and offers Kaiji an opportunity to play "E-Card" and potentially win up to ¥100 million (around $895,400). Kaiji accepts, not wanting to let the organization leave him with nothing.
16	"Fury"; Transliteration: "Dohatsu" (Japanese: 怒髪)	Kim Min-sun; Oyunam (assistant)	Tadao Iwaki	Kim Min-sun	January 23, 2008
Tonegawa explains the rules of E-Card, in which there are 3 types of cards (Citizen, Emperor & Slave). The rules are simple but the odds are against Kaiji, who will be betting his hearing. He is to be fitted with a device which comes closer to his ear drum depending on the amount he bets and how much he loses, with 30mm being the limit the device can travel before it destroys his inner ear. After the instrument is attached to his ear, the game begins. In the 1st round, Kaiji wins the first two hands, increasing his confidence.
17	"Conversation"; Transliteration: "Kaiwa" (Japanese: 会話)	Kenichi Kawamura; Tadao Iwaki	Mitsutaka Hirota	Toshiya Niidome	January 30, 2008
In the 3rd hand of E-Card, with Kaiji playing the Emperor side, Tonegawa wins, saying that the true psychological battle has just begun. In the next 3 rounds, Kaiji will play with the Slave side hand. He draws on the 1st hand but loses the 2nd, shaking his confidence. However the beginning of the 2nd round is a draw.
18	"Trifled"; Transliteration: "Honrō" (Japanese: 翻弄)	Oyunam	Kazuyuki Fudeyasu	Junichi Sakata	February 6, 2008
The 2nd Round of the E-Card game continues with Kaiji trying to find a weakness in Tonegawa, but Kaiji loses the 2nd hand. Kaiji makes a large bet 10mm on the 3rd hand, hoping for a big win, however he misjudges Tonegawa and loses, bringing the destruction of his hearing closer. In the 3rd round, now with the Emperor side hand again, Kaiji also loses the first hand, making 5 losses in a row. In the 8th match, Kaiji loses again, leaving 4 matches to play and only 4mm before his eardrum is pierced.
19	"Limit"; Transliteration: "Genkai" (Japanese: 限界)	Masahiro Hosoda	Tomomi Yoshino	Masahiro Hosoda	February 13, 2008
The 9th match begins and Kaiji's mind is filled with many conflicting thoughts, changing his play at the last moment. However, even without the confidence in his choice he somehow manages to win to ensure his safety. The chairman immediately punishes Tonegawa for losing the hand, making Kaiji suspicious. Through his deductive skills, Kaiji realizes that they are cheating, not reading his play through body language, but through the instrument attached to his ear that sends information to Tonegawa's watch. Confident that he has figured out their method, Kaiji bets 18mm, risking permanent damage or even death.
20	"Fierce God"; Transliteration: "Kishin" (Japanese: 鬼神)	Yoshifumi Sueda	Hideo Takayashiki	Yoshifumi Sueda	February 20, 2008
Having figured out Tonegawa's method of cheating, Kaiji throws a violent fit in the bathroom to attempt to defeat the sensors in his ear. Tonegawa had been using it to measure Kaiji's blood pressure, pulse, body temperature and perspiration. Kaiji returns with his ear covered by a bloody cloth. Tonegawa plays confidently, however Kaiji has tricked him and wins the 2nd hand with the Slave card, winning the round. Too late, Tonegawa realizes that Kaiji had removed the device by cutting off his ear, leaving it in the hands of one of the Human Derby survivors in the bathroom and disguising the fact with the cloth. The device had been transmitting false information to Tonegawa's watch from the bathroom. While the chairman berates Tonegawa, Kaiji appears to use the distraction to switch the cards, then challenges Tonegawa for the 12th and final round.
21	"Heart's Blood"; Transliteration: "Shinketsu" (Japanese: 心血)	Hideo Hayashi	Mitsutaka Hirota	Hideo Hayashi	February 27, 2008
The final match of E-Card begins and Kaiji decides to go for another life-or-death gamble, as he is determined not to leave without winning ¥20 million (around $199,000). The round begins and the first 3 hands are a draw. Tonegawa recalls that Kaiji stained the cards from the previous round with his blood, believing Kaiji has played a Citizen card while he plays his Emperor card.
22	"Punishment"; Transliteration: "Shikkō" (Japanese: 執行)	Hiroyuki Tanaka	Kazuyuki Fudeyasu	Hiroyuki Tanaka	March 5, 2008
Tonegawa believes he has discerned Kaiji's plan of purposely splattering the cards with his blood. However, Kaiji knew that Tonegawa saw his sleight of hand and plays his Slave card, soundly beating Tonegawa. The chairman takes a perverse pleasure in forcing Tonegawa to bow and apologize by pressing his head onto a red-hot griddle for 10 seconds, called the Grilling Grovel, to prove his sincerity. Tonegawa manages to do it, but then Kaiji realizes that the real demon is the sadistic chairman and not Tonegawa, and swears to defeat him.
23	"Deceit"; Transliteration: "Jadō" (Japanese: 邪道)	Nanako Shimazaki	Tomomi Yoshino	Nanako Shimazaki	March 12, 2008
In the restroom with the survivors of the Human Derby, they use tissues to stop the bleeding from Kaiji's damaged ear. The empty tissue box gives Kaiji the idea for a kind of rigged lottery, "Tissue Box Raffle" to beat the chairman. Kaiji's plan is to hide a duplicate winning piece of paper towel inside the edge of the box and convince the chairman to play his game. With all preparations met he heads out to challenge the chairman to one more gamble.
24	"Conditions"; Transliteration: "Jōken" (Japanese: 条件)	Kim Min-sun; Oyunam (assistant)	Mitsutaka Hirota	Keiji Gotoh	March 19, 2008
Through Kaiji's persistence, the chairman finally accepts his challenge and then Kaiji convinces the chairman to accept his idea of a Tissue Box Raffle. However the chairman places three conditions, including that the chairman will draw the first lot and that Kaiji must wager his entire ¥20 million (around $199,000) winnings plus four of his fingers against a pot of ¥100 million (around $995,000). Reluctantly, Kaiji accepts the conditions.
25	"Investment"; Transliteration: "Tōnyū" (Japanese: 投入)	Yoshifumi Sueda	Kazuyuki Fudeyasu	Ryōsuke Nakamura	March 26, 2008
Preparations for the Tissue Box Raffle are complete, and before the lottery draw begins they place the winning lot inside the box together, but the chairman is last to withdraw his hand. The chairman is also first to draw a lot, and takes a long time with his selection, but he draws a blank. Kaiji takes his turn, but he cannot find his duplicate winning lot on the inside edge of the box where he had placed it earlier. He draws a blank and realizes that he has only a 50-50 chance of winning.
26	"Afterglow"; Transliteration: "Zankō" (Japanese: 残光)	Yuzo Sato; Tadao Iwaki	Hideo Takayashiki	Yuzo Sato	April 2, 2008
As dawn approaches, the chairman draws the winning piece, and as the devastated Kaiji prepares to have his fingers severed he asks the chairman his name which he says is Kazutaka Hyōdō. Later, as all the survivors wait in the foyer of the building to leave, they examine the box and find the duplicate winning ticket crumpled in a corner, meaning that Hyōdō had figured out their strategy. On re-examining the winning piece, Kaiji sees that it was folded, something Hyōdō had done when placing the winning piece inside the box before the draw. As they depart, with Kaiji's severed ear and fingers in a bag of ice, Kaiji realizes how experienced and cunning Hyōdō is and that he should have quit while he had the ¥20 million winnings. However he still wants revenge.
