= List of Tobaku Datenroku Kaiji: 24 Oku Dasshutsu-hen chapters =

First tankōbon volume cover of Tobaku Datenroku Kaiji: 24 Oku Dasshutsu-hen

Tobaku Datenroku Kaiji: 24 Oku Dasshutsu-hen is the sixth part of the manga series Kaiji by Nobuyuki Fukumoto. It started in Kodansha's seinen manga magazine Weekly Young Magazine in 2017. Kodansha released its first two tankōbon volumes on June 6, 2018. As of December 6, 2023, 26 volumes have been released.

== Volumes ==
No.	Release date	ISBN
01 (66)	June 6, 2018	978-4-06-510942-7
256. "2.4 Billion" (24億, 24-Oku); 257. "Tiger's Den" (虎口, Kokō); 258. "Blockade" (封鎖, Fūsa); 259. "Reckless Run" (爆走, Bakusō); 260. "Withdrawal" (撤収, Tesshū); 261. "Toast" (乾杯, Kanpai); 262. "Elaboration" (敷衍, Fuen); 263. "Godsend" (僥倖, Gyōkō); 264. "Chance of Winning" (勝機, Shōki)
02 (67)	June 6, 2018	978-4-06-511840-5
265. "Absolute" (絶対, Zettai); 266. "Killer Demon" (波旬, Hajun); 267. "Benefactor" (恩人, Onjin); 268. "Foam" (泡沫, Utakata); 269. "On the Road" (路上, Rojō); 270. "Ambitious Undertaking" (壮途, Sōto); 271. "For Nothing" (水泡, Suihō); 272. "Location" (拠点, Kyoten); 273. "Separation" (離脱, Ridatsu)
03 (68)	March 6, 2019	978-4-06-514795-5
274. "Expedition" (遠征, Ensei); 275. "Disposal" (破棄, Haki); 276. "Negotiation" (折衝, Sesshō); 277. "Hospitality" (歓待, Kantai); 278. "Private Lodging" (民泊, Minpaku); 279. "Scolding" (喝破, Kappa); 280. "Running About" (奔走, Honsō); 281. "Dearest Wish" (悲願, Higan); 282. "Unlocking" (開錠, Kaijō)
04 (69)	July 5, 2019	978-4-06-516350-4
283. "Oversight" (不覚, Fukaku); 284. "Mission" (任務, Ninmu); 285. "Urgency" (切迫, Seppaku); 286. "Futility" (徒労, Torō); 287. "Anticipation" (鶴首, Kakushu); 288. "Reunion" (再会, Saikai); 289. "Manhunt" (探索, Tansaku); 290. "Thunderclap" (霹靂, Hekireki); 291. "Torture" (拷問, Gōmon)
05 (70)	November 6, 2019	978-4-06-517727-3
292. "Fake Bait" (擬餌, Giji); 293. "Shopkeeper" (店主, Tenshu); 294. "Center" (真中, Man'naka); 295. "Imperative" (枢要, Sūyō); 296. "Blind Spot" (盲点, Mōten); 297. "Family Home" (実家, Jikka); 298. "Housing Complex" (団地, Danchi); 299. "Homecoming" (帰省, Kisei)
06 (71)	December 6, 2019	978-4-06-517852-2
300. "Bathroom" (浴室, Yokushitsu); 301. "Bankrupt" (倒産, Tōsan); 302. "Kyōgen" (狂言); 303. "Sounding Out" (瀬踏, Setō); 304. "Possessed" (憑依, Hyōi); 305. "United Front" (共闘, Kyōtō); 306. "Presentment" (披露, Hirō); 307. "Hunting Hound" (猟犬, Ryōken)
07 (72)	June 5, 2020	978-4-06-519997-8
308. "Cornered Mouse" (窮鼠, Kyūso); 309. "Bulwark" (籠城, Rōjō); 310. "Outline" (総覧, Sōran); 311. "Aspiration" (志願, Shigan); 312. "Next Morning" (翌朝, Yokuasa); 313. "Goddess" (女神, Megami); 314. "Silence" (無音, Muon); 315. "Abduction" (拉致, Rachi); 316. "Search" (探索, Tansaku)
08 (73)	October 6, 2020	978-4-06-520991-2
317. "Error" (一失, Isshitsu); 318. "Revelation" (天啓, Tenkei); 319. "Leaving the Nest" (巣立, Sudate); 320. "Future" (未来, Mirai); 321. "Befitting" (相応, Sōō); 322. "Teller Window" (窓口, Madoguchi); 323. "Wasteful Spending" (徒消, Toshō); 324. "Paper Slip" (紙片, Shihen)
09 (74)	November 6, 2020	978-4-06-521333-9
325. "Disturbance" (動転, Dōten); 326. "Calamity" (厄災, Yakusai); 327. "Misconception" (誤謬, Gobyū); 328. "Narrow-Mindedness" (偏狭, Henkyō); 329. "Official Notice" (布令, Fure); 330. "Blind Spot" (死角, Shikaku); 331. "Surprise" (吃驚, Bikkuri); 332. "Distress" (憂患, Yūkan)
10 (75)	February 5, 2021	978-4-06-522281-2
333. "Anxiety" (心労, Shinrō); 334. "Sadism" (嗜虐, Shigyaku); 335. "Confession" (告白, Kokuhaku); 336. "Pie in the Sky" (画餅, Gabei); 337. "Standstill" (停留, Teiryū); 338. "Bull's Eye" (正鵠, Seikoku); 339. "Closing In" (肉薄, Nikuhaku)
11 (76)	May 6, 2021	978-4-06-523344-3
340. "Encounter" (遭遇, Sōgū); 341. "Two-Faced" (表裏, Hyōri); 342. "Self-Defense" (陳弁, Chinben); 343. "Stratagem" (手管, Tekuda); 344. "Fight" (喧嘩, Kenka); 345. "Vain Dream" (邯鄲, Kantan); 346. "Quick Wittedness" (機転, Kiten)
12 (77)	July 6, 2021	978-4-06-523987-2
347. "Rebuttal" (駁論, Bakuron); 348. "Trailblazing" (開拓, Kaitaku); 349. "Shangri-La" (桃源, Tōgen); 350. "Bivouac" (露宿, Roshuku); 351. "Intimacy" (昵懇, Jikkon); 352. "Drunkards" (酔漢, Suikan); 353. "Cockrow" (鶏鳴, Keimei)
13 (78)	September 6, 2021	978-4-06-524745-7
354. "Beloved Car" (愛車, Aisha); 355. "Pursuit" (追跡, Tsuiseki); 356. "Plan B" (次善, Jizen); 357. "Fast Driving" (疾駆, Shikku); 358. "Barbarity" (蛮行, Bankō); 359. "Rationality" (適理, Tekiri); 360. "Clever Move" (妙手, Myōshu)
14 (79)	November 5, 2021	978-4-06-525873-6
361. "Qualm" (懸念, Kenen); 362. "Abysmal" (最悪, Saiaku); 363. "Third Attempt" (三矢, Mitsuya); 364. "Refueling" (給油, Kyūyu); 365. "Unexpected" (望外, Bōgai); 366. "Preference" (嗜好, Shikō); 367. "Apprehension" (憂慮, Yūryo)
15 (80)	January 6, 2022	978-4-06-526487-4
368. "Young Samurai" (青侍, Aosamurai); 369. "Breakfast" (朝餉, Asage); 370. "King" (王様, Ōsama); 371. "Surprise Attack" (奇襲, Kishū); 372. "Unveiling" (開帳, Kaichō); 373. "Revelation" (暴露, Bakuro); 374. "Delusion" (迷妄, Meimō); 375. "Suspicion" (猜疑, Saigi)
16 (81)	March 4, 2022	978-4-06-527111-7
376. "Interrogation" (追尋, Tsuijin); 377. "Departure" (出立, Shuttatsu); 378. "Change of Mind" (翻意, Hon'i); 379. "New Home" (新居, Shinkyo); 380. "Shelter" (寓居, Gūkyo); 381. "Wicked" (腹黒, Haraguro); 382. "Foresight" (遠謀, Enbō)
17 (82)	May 6, 2022	978-4-06-527111-7
383. "False Charges" (濡衣, Nureginu); 384. "Obstinate" (偏屈, Henkutsu); 385. "Repentance" (悔悛, Kaishun); 386. "Placation" (懐柔, Kaijū); 387. "Wake-up Call" (警鐘, Keishō); 388. "Fable" (童話, Dōwa); 389. "Reform" (刷新, Sasshin); 390. "Gambler's Dream" (博夢, Hakumu); 391. "Protection" (守護, Shugo)
18 (83)	July 6, 2022	978-4-06-528476-6
392. "Sound Sleep" (熟眠, Jukumin); 393. "Neighbor" (隣人, Rinjin); 394. "Dwelling" (居宅, Kyotaku); 395. "Benefit" (享受, Kyōju); 396. "Deep Sleep" (春眠, Shunmin); 397. "Remorse" (悔恨, Kaikon); 398. "Unforeseen Misfortune" (奇禍, Kika); 399. "Jealousy" (悋気, Rinki)
19 (84)	September 6, 2022	978-4-06-529117-7
400. "Surveillance" (行確, Kōkaku); 401. "Holding Back" (留保, Ryūho); 402. "Identification" (同定, Dōtei); 403. "Caged Bird" (籠鳥, Rōchō); 404. "Enterprise" (自業, Jigyō); 405. "Scatter" (雲散, Unsan); 406. "Gone Like Mist" (霧消, Mushō); 407. "Reporting to Superior" (上申, Jōshin)
20 (85)	November 4, 2022	978-4-06-529807-7
408. "Magic Trick" (品玉, Shinadama); 409. "Chance Encounter" (会偶, Kaitama); 410. "Cognitive Distortion" (顛倒, Tentō); 411. "Propulsion" (噴射, Funsha); 412. "Day Drinking" (昼酒, Hiruzake); 413. "Expediency" (応変, Ōhen); 414. "Sojourn" (滞在, Taizai)
21 (86)	January 6, 2023	978-4-06-530381-8
415. "Intersecting" (交錯, Kōsaku); 416. "Reconnaissance" (偵察, Teisatsu); 417. "Selection" (選定, Sentei); 418. "Accounting" (会計, Kaikei); 419. "Comparison" (照合, Shōgō); 420. "Truth" (正体, Shōtai); 421. "Urgent Notice" (急告, Kyūkoku)
22 (87)	March 6, 2023	978-4-06-531049-6
422. "Reaffirmation" (再確, Saikaku); 423. "Increased Staff" (増員, Zōin); 424. "Crisis" (危局, Kikyoku); 425. "Perspiration" (蒸散, Jōsan); 426. "Outside the Store" (店外, Misegai); 427. "Taking the Scene" (降臨, Kōrin); 428. "Runway" (花道, Hanamichi); 429. "Armada" (艦隊, Kantai)
23 (88)	May 8, 2023	978-4-06-531692-4
430. "Breakthrough" (突破, Toppa); 431. "Deployment" (配備, Haibi); 432. "Time Out" (閑所, Kanjo); 433. "Lifeline" (命綱, Inochizuna); 434. "Heavy Responsibility" (重責, Jūseki); 435. "Car Window" (車窓, Shasō); 436. "On Duty" (賃走, Chinsō)
24 (89)	July 6, 2023	978-4-06-532252-9
437. "Atonement" (贖罪, Shokuzai); 438. "Lingering Memories" (余韻, Yoin); 439. "Two Options" (二択, Ni-taku); 440. "Going Dark" (潜行, Senkō); 441. "En Route" (迎車, Geisha); 442. "Funeral" (葬送, Sōsō); 443. "Cramped" (狭小, Kyōshō)
25 (90)	October 5, 2023	978-4-06-533369-3
444. "Hospital Room" (病室, Byōshitsu); 445. "Daily Life" (起臥, Kiga); 446. "Cornered Bird" (窮鳥, Kyūchō); 447. "Fulfillment" (成就, Jōju); 448. "Overlooking" (不問, Fumon); 449. "Advice" (進言, Shingen); 450. "Right or Wrong" (正誤, Seigo)
26 (91)	December 6, 2023	978-4-06-533928-2
451. "Return" (帰還, Kikan); 452. "Woodchips" (木片, Mokuhen); 453. "Remedy" (矯正, Kyōsei); 454. "Damage" (損壊, Sonkai); 455. "Intervention" (介入, Kainyū); 456. "Patrol" (巡回, Junkai); 457. "Winning Over" (懐柔, Kaijū); 458. "Offer" (奉献, Hōken)

== Chapters not yet in tankōbon format ==
The following chapters were published in Weekly Young Magazine from May to June 2023, but have yet to be collected in tankōbon format.

459. "Rock Door" (岩戸, Iwato)
460. "Explanation" (陳弁, Chinben)
461. "Influence" (顔役, Kaoyaku)
