= Onna no Yūjō to Kinniku =

Japanese manga series

- First tankōbon volume cover

女の友情と筋肉
- Genre: Comedy; Slice of life
- Manga
- Written by: KANA
- Published by: Seikaisha
- Imprint: Seikaisha Comics
- Magazine: Saizensen
- Original run: September 9, 2014 – April 10, 2022
- Volumes: 8

Onna no Yūjō to Kinniku (女の友情と筋肉) is a Japanese four-panel manga series written and illustrated by KANA. It was serialized on Seikaisha's Saizensen website and Twi4 Twitter account from September 2014 to April 2022, with its chapters collected in eight volumes.

== Synopsis ==
The series is centered around the lives of three muscular and athletic working women. Iori Murakami, Yui Kanda and Mayu Konishi have been friends since elementary school, and now have jobs in their adolescence. The series also focuses on the trio's romantic lives.

== Characters ==
Iori Murakami (村上イオリ, Murakami Iori)
Portrayed by: Yūta Fukuda
Yui Kanda (神田ユイ, Kanda Yui)
Portrayed by: Kento Tomioka
Mayu Konishi (小西マユ, Konishi Mayu)
Portrayed by: Ruito Aoyagi

== Media ==
=== Manga ===
Written and illustrated by KANA, Onna no Yūjō to Kinniku was serialized on Seikaisha's Saizensen website and Twi4 Twitter account from September 9, 2014 to April 10, 2022. Its chapters were collected in eight tankōbon volumes released from January 10, 2015 to May 11, 2022.

No.	Release date	ISBN
1	January 10, 2015	978-4-06-369521-2
2	June 11, 2015	978-4-06-369533-5
3	December 19, 2015	978-4-06-369541-0
4	May 27, 2016	978-4-06-369548-9
5	February 10, 2017	978-4-06-369563-2
6	May 24, 2017	978-4-06-369574-8
7	August 11, 2019	978-4-06-517428-9
8	May 11, 2022	978-4-06-528072-0

=== Stage play ===
A stage play adaptation ran in the Stella Ball at the Shinagawa Prince Hotel in Tokyo between September 16–25, 2022 and at the Cool Japan Park Osaka TT Hall in Osaka between October 1–2, 2022. The play starred Yuta Fukuda, Kento Tomioka, and Ruito Aoyagi as the three lead characters. A second play featuring the cast reprising their roles was held in the same cities between May 17 and June 9, 2024.

== Reception ==
The series was ranked eighth in the 2016 edition of Takarajimasha's Kono Manga ga Sugoi! guidebook list of the best manga for female readers.
