= Tomoya Nakamura =

Japanese actor (born 1986)

- 中村 倫也
- Born: December 24, 1986 (age 39); Tokyo, Japan
- Occupation: Actor
- Years active: 2005–present
- Agent: Top Coat
- Spouse: Asami Miura (m. 2023)

Tomoya Nakamura (中村 倫也, Nakamura Tomoya; born December 24, 1986) is a Japanese actor.

== Career ==
Nakamura made his debut in the film The Innocent Seven in 2005.

== Personal life ==
On March 25, 2023, Nakamura married Nippon TV announcer Asami Miura; they had also jointly announced their marriage through a letter on their respective social media accounts.

== Filmography ==
=== Film ===
Year	Title	Role	Notes	Ref.
2005	The Innocent Seven			
2007	For Those We Love			
2009	The Unbroken			
2013	Like Father, Like Son			
2013	My Life Changed When I Went To a Sex Parlor			
2013	Spinning Kite	Jun	Lead role	
2014	Boo-ko's Rosy Future			
2014	Princess Jellyfish			
2015	Maestro!			
2016	Lost and Found	Haruto Seo	Lead role	
2016	Twisted Justice			
2017	Gukoroku: Traces of Sin			
2017	March Comes in Like a Lion	Tatsuyuki Misumi		
2017	March Goes out Like a Lamb	Tatsuyuki Misumi		
2017	Laughing Lucky Cats			
2017	Asahinagu			
2017	My Teacher			
2018	The Many Faces of Ito	Kentarō Kuzumi		
2018	The Blood of Wolves	Kyōji		
2018	Oz Land	Konishi		
2019	Marriage Hunting Beauty			
2019	Murders at the House of Death	Kyōsuke Akechi		
2019	The Stormy Family			
2019	A Long Goodbye			
2020	Beneath the Shadow	Kazuya Soejima		
2020	Gone Wednesday		Lead role	
2020	Silent Tokyo	Motoki Sunaga		
2020	The Town of Headcounts	Aoyama	Lead role	
2020	Hold Me Back	"A" (voice)		
2021	Kiba: The Fangs of Fiction	Koretaka Iba		
2021	First Love	Kashū Anno		
2021	World Cats Travelogue 2	Narrator		
2021	The Crocodile That Lived for 100 Days	Mouse (voice)		
2022	Wedding High	Akiko Ōku		
2022	Anime Supremacy!	Chiharu Ōji		
2023	My Brother, the Alien	Hideo Sanada	Lead role	
2023	The Silent Service	Sōshi Irie		
2023	Spy × Family Code: White	Dmitri (voice)		
2024	Missing	Sunada		
2024	Last Mile			
2024	Who's Gone	Resident of the room 201		
2025	The Silent Service: The Battle of the Arctic Ocean	Sōshi Irie		
2025	Peleliu: Guernica of Paradise	Keisuke Yoshiki (voice)		
2026	Your Own Quiz	Reo Mishima	Lead role	
2026	Bye Bye Love: Detective Is in the Bar	Adachi		

=== Television ===
Year	Title	Role	Notes	Ref.
2005	H2	Osamu Shima		
2005–06	Kaze no Haruka	Yukio Kanzaki	Asadora	
2009	Tenchijin	Toyotomi Hideyori	Taiga drama	
2014	Gunshi Kanbei	Oda Nobutada	Taiga drama	
2014	Aoi Honō	Takami Akai		
2017	Super Salaryman Mr. Saenai	Karino		
2018	Half Blue Sky	Masato Asai	Asadora	
2018	Holiday Love	Wataru Izutsu		
2019	A Story to Read When You First Fall in Love	Kazuma Yamashita		
2019	Nagi's Long Vacation	Gon Arashiro		
2020	Gourmet Detective Goro Akechi	Goro Akechi	Lead role	
2020	A Warmed Up Love	Takumi Asaba		
2020	Thus Spoke Kishibe Rohan	Tarō Hirai	Mini-series	
2021	Vous Voulez du Cafe?	Hajime Aoyama	Lead role	
2021	Life's Punchline	Mimomi Kusunoki		
2021–24	No Activity	Asobu Shiina	Lead role; 2 seasons	
2022	Ishiko and Haneo: You're Suing Me?	Yoshio "Haneo" Haneoka	Lead role	
2022	Kamen Rider Black Sun	Nobuhiko Akizuki / Kamen Rider Shadow Moon	Lead role	
2023	Hayabusa Fire Brigade	Tarō Mima	Lead role	
2024	The Silent Service	Sōshi Irie		
2024	Boogie Woogie	Numabukuro	Asadora	
2024	Shrink: Psychiatrist Yowai	Kōnosuke Yowai	Lead role; miniseries	
2025	Dope: Narcotics Control Department Special Investigation Unit	Teppei Jinnai	Lead role	
2026	The Scent of the Wind	Toji Yagyu	Asadora	
2027	The Shogunate Rebel	Yoshida Shōin	Taiga drama	

=== Japanese dub ===
Year	Title	Role	Dub for	Notes	Ref.
2019	Aladdin	Aladdin	Mena Massoud		

== Awards and nominations ==
Year	Award	Category	Work(s)	Result	Ref.
2019	43rd Elan d'or Awards	Newcomer of the Year	Himself	Won	
2019	Elle Cinema Awards 2019	Elle Men Award	The Stormy Family and others	Won	
2022	35th Nikkan Sports Film Awards	Best Supporting Actor	Anime Supremacy! and Wedding High	Nominated	
