= Anxious Virgin: One More Time, I Love You =

- DVD cover
- Directed by: Shun Nakahara
- Screenplay by: Hiroaki Jinno; Shun Nakahara
- Produced by: Taketo Niitsu
- Starring: Shinobu Nakayama; Yasufumi Hayashi; Masato Hagiwara; Rika Furukawa; Ichirō Ogura
- Cinematography: Tōru Satō
- Edited by: Isao Tomita
- Music by: Hitomi Kuroishi
- Production companies: Nikkatsu Co., Ltd.; New Century Producers
- Distributed by: Nikkatsu Video
- Release date: October 26, 1990 (Japan)
- Running time: 76 minutes
- Country: Japan
- Language: Japanese

Anxious Virgin: One More Time, I Love You (Japanese: Doki Doki ヴァージン もういちど I LOVE YOU, Hepburn: Dokidoki Virgin mô ichido I Love You) is a 1990 Japanese romantic fantasy comedy direct-to-video film directed by Shun Nakahara and co-written by Nakahara with Hiroaki Jinno. The film tells the story of a virgin teenage boy who dies and is resurrected in the body of a young girl. It stars Shinobu Nakayama in her feature film debut, in addition to Yasufumi Hayashi, Masato Hagiwara, Rika Furukawa and Ichirō Ogura. Hitomi Kuroishi composed the film's soundtrack, while the songs were selected by Yutaka Goda. Anxious Virgin: One More Time, I Love You was released by Nikkatsu Video on October 26, 1990, in Japan.

== Premise ==
Hideki Nakazawa is a teenager desperate to lose his virginity. However, he dies in a traffic accident. He meets God in heaven, and God gives him a second chance. He is resurrected in the body of Mari, a girl from the next town over. Yet Hideki is disappointed, thinking that he'll never be able to lose his virginity as a girl. Soon, a series of dreamlike scenes unfold. Mari's older sister, Riko, casually gets naked in front of him, and he realizes that he's free to enter the girls' locker room. In addition, Hideki falls for Mari's best friend, Sachiko, a member of the high school swimming club. However, Sachiko has a crush on someone else: Kakinuma, Hideki's former classmate and rival in the swimming club. Kakinuma is the school's chief lothario. Hideki and Kakinuma fight over Sachiko.

== Cast ==
- Shinobu Nakayama as Sachiko
- Yasufumi Hayashi as Hideki Nakazawa
- Rika Furukawa as Riko
- Ichirō Ogura as God
- Risa Hayase as Blindfolded girl
- Akiyo Tomita as Twin in heaven
- Chiharu Tomita as Twin in heaven
- Masato Hagiwara
- Yoshiyuki Omori
- Keiichi Minowa
- Noritoshi Yoshishima
- Takumi Haruyama
- Yumi Goto
- Daisuke Sano
- Yuri Takigawa
- Sachie Hasegawa
- Maki Muto
- Machiko Nakao
- Yasuyuki Otani
- Junpei Natsuki
- Hachiro Misumi
- Michino Yokoyama

== Background ==
Nakahara directed this production back-to-back with his more famous film The Cherry Orchard from the same year. Lead actress Shinobu Nakayama was an idol who made her feature film debut in this production. Anxious Virgin: One More Time, I Love You was the second production released under the Nikkatsu Video label. Both director Nakahara and co-writer Hiroaki Jinno began their careers in pink films, and the film incorporates erotic comedy into the story. A 2021 DVD release includes the disclaimer, "Some parts of the [film] may be considered inappropriate today, but we have respected the intentions of the producers and [presented] the content as it was shown at the time."

== Release ==
Anxious Virgin: One More Time, I Love You was released by Nikkatsu Video on October 26, 1990, in Japan. It was later released to DVD by Pioneer Entertainment. The film is also available for streaming on Amazon Prime in Japan. In February 2026, the film was shown at the International Film Festival Rotterdam.
