= 17th Yokohama Film Festival =

1996 film festival in Yokohama, Japan

- Location: Kannai Hall, Yokohama, Kanagawa, Japan
- Founded: 1980
- Festival date: 4 February 1996

The 17th Yokohama Film Festival (第17回ヨコハマ映画祭) was held on 4 February 1996 in Kannai Hall, Yokohama, Kanagawa, Japan.

== Awards ==
- Best Film: Love Letter
- Best Actor: Etsushi Toyokawa – Love Letter
- Best Actress: Miho Nakayama – Love Letter
- Best Supporting Actor: Kazuhiko Kanayama – Burai Heiya, Another Lonely Hitman
- Best Supporting Actress: Shinobu Nakayama – Gamera: Guardian of the Universe
- Best Director:
  - Shūsuke Kaneko – Gamera: Guardian of the Universe
  - Shunji Iwai – Love Letter
- Best New Director: Atsushi Muroga – Score
- Best Screenplay: Kazunori Itō – Gamera: Guardian of the Universe, Ghost in the Shell / Kōkaku Kidōtai
- Best Cinematography: Noboru Shinoda – Love Letter
- Best New Talent:
  - Reiko Kataoka – Ai no Shinsekai, Kamikaze Taxi
  - Sawa Suzuki – Yakuza Ladies: Blood Ties, Ai no Shinsekai, A Brief Message from the Heart, Teito Monogatari Gaiden
  - Miki Sakai – Love Letter
- Best Technical: Shinji Higuchi – Gamera: Guardian of the Universe – For his special effects.
- Special Jury Prize: Score – For the actors who played the "Score Gangs".
- Special Prize: Ikuo Sekimoto – Yakuza Ladies: Blood Ties – For his work.

== Best 10 ==
1. Love Letter
2. Gamera: Guardian of the Universe
3. Ai no Shinsekai
4. Kamikaze Taxi
5. Gonin
6. Burai Heiya
7. Boxer Joe
8. Tōkyō Kyōdai
9. Ashita
10. Score

runner-up: Endless Waltz
