= Shun Nakahara =

Japanese film director (born 1951)

- 中原 俊
- Born: Toshihiro Nakahara (中原 俊弘); May 25, 1951 (age 75); Sōmuta, Kagoshima, Japan
- Occupation: Film director

Shun Nakahara (中原 俊, Nakahara Shun; born May 25, 1951 as Toshihiro Nakahara (中原 俊弘, Nakahara Toshihiro)) is a Japanese film director and a professor at the Japan Institute of the Moving Image. He began his career directing Roman Porno films, and since then he has dealt with a wide range of subjects regardless of genre. He won the award for Best Director at the 12th Yokohama Film Festival for Sakura no Sono.

== Filmography ==
- Candidate for Seduction (1982)
- Slave Contract: Whip & High Heels (1982)
- Seiko's Juicy Thighs: Public Bath Beauty (1982)
- Koichiro Uno's Dirty Sisters' Barber Shoppe (1983)
- Sannen-me no Uwaki (1983)
- Eve's Flower Petal (1984)
- Rope Sisters: Strange Fruit (1984)
- Shoya no umi (1984)
- Leave My Girl Alone (1986)
- Makeup (1987)
- Shakotan Boogie (1987)
- Neko no youni (1988)
- Dokidoki Virgin mô ichido I Love You, aka Anxious Virgin: One More Time, I Love You (1990)
- The Cherry Orchard (1990)
- The Gentle 12, aka 12 Gentle Japanese (1991)
- Off-season (1992)
- Yamikin no teiou Gin to Kin (1993) – Based on Gin to Kin
- Yamikin no teiou Gin to Kin 2 (1994) – Based on Gin to Kin
- Yabô dake ga ai o korosu 3: Game no kisoku (1995 direct-to-video film, co-directed with Hiroaki Jinno)
- Lie Lie Lie (1997)
- Coquille (1999)
- Colorful (2000)
- The Dentist, aka Shikai (2000)
- Konsento (2002)
- Tomie: The Final Chapter -Forbidden Fruit- (2002)
- Sky High (2003, TV series)
- Déracine (2004)
- Onna no naka no futatsu no kao (2004, TV movie)
- DV: Domestic Violence (2005)
- Ichigo Chips (2005, co-directed with Tsutomu Takahashi)
- Curling Love (2007)
- Rakugo musume (2008)
- The Cherry Orchard: Blossoming (2008)
- Someday's Dreamers (2008)
- Housewife's Afternoon Delight (2010)
