= Gin to Kin =

Japanese manga series

- Cover of the sixth tankōbon volume, featuring Ginji Hirai (right) and Tetsuo Morita (left)

銀と金
- Genre: Gambling
- Manga
- Written by: Nobuyuki Fukumoto
- Published by: Futabasha
- Imprint: Action Comics
- Magazine: Action Pizazz
- Original run: 1992 – 1996
- Volumes: 11
- Television drama
- Directed by: Tomoyuki Furumaya; Yūji Nakamae
- Produced by: Taku Matsumoto; Yūta Kurachi; Toshiki Kitagawa
- Written by: Junpei Yamaoka; Nonji Nemoto
- Music by: Kuniyuki Morohashi
- Studio: Dai-Ei TV Film
- Original network: TV Tokyo
- Original run: January 7, 2017 – March 25, 2017
- Episodes: 12 + 1
- icon

Gin to Kin (銀と金; lit. 'Silver and Gold') is a Japanese manga series written and illustrated by Nobuyuki Fukumoto. It was serialized in Futabasha's Action Pizazz from 1992 to 1996, with its chapters collected in eleven tankōbon volumes. The series portrays the machinations of men living in the underworld, including speculative stock wars and backroom deals with politicians, deadly struggles for life against vengeful and crazed murderers, and Fukumoto's signature gambling games. After running for 108 chapters, the serialization ended abruptly and discontinued. Gin to Kin has also been adapted into seven direct-to-video movies and a 12-episode television drama.

== Characters ==
=== Ginji's Group ===
Ginji Hirai (平井 銀二, Hirai Ginji)
Portrayed by: Kiyoshi Nakajō (direct-to-video films), Lily Franky (TV drama)
He works as a fixer in the underground society under the alias "Silver King". His nickname is "Gin". He has outstanding capabilities in every respect and a unique philosophy of life. He draws Morita into the underworld as a man who fits the "conditions" and expects him to grow and develop his talents. With his demonic train of thought, he squeezes money out of the weak and the wicked, but his greatest ambition is to use powerful politicians such as Izawa to control the country's economic world, believing that it takes a greater evil to defeat evil.
Tetsuo Morita (森田 鉄雄, Morita Tetsuo)
Portrayed by: Kōsuke Toyohara (direct-to-video films), Sosuke Ikematsu (TV drama)
Though he was no more than a penniless gambling addict, after being approached by Ginji Hirai at the racetrack, he decides to live in the underworld where the wicked hold on to the money. On one hand, he has the sharpness and genius to see through his opponents' lies and win, but he also possesses monstrous luck, sometimes acting beyond the principle of profit or loss, which Ginji and the others cannot do. He admires Ginji's villainous nature and his genius for acquiring money, and aspires to surpass him by becoming the "gold" to his "silver."
Iwao Yasuda (安田 巌, Yasuda Iwao)
Portrayed by: Makita Sports (TV drama)
A former member of the Tokyo Metropolitan Police Department. Of all the members, he is often portrayed as trusting Morita in particular.
Yūzō Tatsumi (巽 有三, Tatsumi Yūzō)
Portrayed by: Asami Usuda (as Kyōko Tatsumi (巽 京子, Tatsumi Kyōko), TV drama)
A former newspaper reporter. Using his experience from the occupation, he supports Ginji by gathering information. He always wears sunglasses and never exposes his face.
Masashi Funada (船田 正志, Funada Masashi)
Portrayed by: Jun Murakami (TV drama)
A retired public prosecutor who belonged to the Tokyo District Public Prosecutor's Special Criminal Investigation Department and is a broker who deals with companies based on their background. Of all the members, he appears in the story the least.
Ryōhei Kawamatsu (川松 良平, Kawamatsu Ryōhei)
Portrayed by: Ken Kaneko (direct-to-video films)
A young man who joined the group after the horse racing match. Like Morita, he got engrossed in gambling and ended up shouldering a debt of 4 million yen. The resemblance between him and his target, Yōichi Kōno's fourth son, leads Ginji to come up with a secret plan and put the operation into action.

=== Miscellaneous ===
Takeshi Domon (土門 猛, Domon Takeshi)
Portrayed by: Gorō Ōishi (TV drama)
President of Teinichi Bank. He was caught to be in a collusive relationship by Ginji's group. The collusion was out of the kindness of wanting to support his daughter's marriage partner, Diet member Kaidō. At first he was hostile, but Ginji persuaded him, and from then on, they put their trust in each other and became powerful collaborators.
Atsushi Izawa (伊沢 敦志, Izawa Atsushi)
The number 2 of Takemoto Party, the largest faction of the Constitutional Democratic Party (modeled after the Liberal Democratic Party). He is asked by Morita to help save Ginji and the others, and although he is successfully deceived in the end, he admires Morita's imposing attitude and cooperates with Ginji's team.
Tetsu Umeya (梅谷 哲, Umeya Tetsu)
Portrayed by: Dankan (TV drama)
The top manager of Marutomi General Business Group, which develops hotels and real estate businesses nationwide. He has a complex about his ugly looks, which is why he is aware that he is a "monkey who does not have money" and believes in the power of cash. However, Ginji rescued him from his role when he was about to go bankrupt after spending most of his assets in a stock purchase war. After Ginji was captured, he introduced Izawa, with whom he had a previous relationship, to Morita.
Kenji Ariga (有賀 研二, Ariga Kenji)
Portrayed by: Tōru Tezuka (TV drama)
A murderer who has brought about seven serial murder incidents in one city and six prefectures of the whole district of Kanto, and shook the world with atrocities such as cutting the body with the victim still alive.
Akio Nakajō (中条 明夫, Nakajō Akio)
Portrayed by: Shirō Sano (as Akio Nakajima (中島 昭夫, Nakajima Akio), TV drama)
An art dealer whose business is failing due to the recession. In his early life he was a naive young man who wanted to become a painter after being struck by Paul Cézanne's work in an art museum, but his mind was warped by years of peering into the dark side of the business.
Mitsunari Kawata (川田 三成, Kawata Mitsunari)
A swindler who reached out to Morita when he was about to be charged an outrageous fee at Nakajō's club. Later, with the promise of splitting the rewards evenly, he went along with Morita's plan, helping him to purchase a counterfeit from a Spanish syndicate.
Mio Itō (伊藤 美緒, Itō Mio)
Portrayed by: Sara Takatsuki (live-action TV series)
A waitress at the coffee shop Morita used to visit. She was the catalyst for the match against Saijō. She is in love with Morita and asks for a relationship with him after the fight is settled, but is declined.
Shinya Saijō (西条 進也, Saijō Shinya)
Portrayed by: Shunsuke Daitō (as Tatsuya Saijō (西条 達也, Saijō Tatsuya), TV drama)
The second son of the president of Saijō Constructions, a first-class corporation. With his mates Arita, the eldest son of the president of a real estate company and Okabe, the eldest son of the president of a pharmaceutical company, they play poker and cheat on young women, keeping their money and bodies in their hands.
Hitoshi Kuramae (蔵前 仁, Kuramae Hitoshi)
Portrayed by: Akira Emoto (TV drama)
The chairman of the massive group "Seikyō," which has risen to the top in one generation, and an old man with a huge amount of wealth. He holds gambling parties for politicians and pays them if they win, and even if they lose, he pays them with a letter of credit with a low interest rate, and cozies up to political power by not charging those who give him something in return for his policies. On the other hand, he calls those who can not pay his bills "domesticated," literally locking them in cages "until they die," feeding them nothing but food and pornographic videos, without even a clock in sight. As a result, he takes great pleasure in watching the destruction of human dignity in modern society while having a drink in hand.
Hidemine Kamui (神威 秀峰, Kamui Hidemine)
The seventh patriarch of the Kamui family, he is 85 years old and insane enough to be willing to kill his sons for himself and the Kamui family. Prehistoric traditions passed down through the clan forced the brothers to fight with each other, and as a result, a horrible revenge tragedy was born. His given name is derived from Shūhō Satō (same kanji spelling), a manga artist who worked as Fukumoto's assistant at the time.
Katsuteru Kamui (神威 勝輝, Kamui Katsuteru)
The eldest son of the Kamui family and a member of the Lower House. Fed up with the patriarchal power that has made the brothers compete with each other, he tries to murder them all. Unlike the other brothers, he is a cunning leader.
Katsunobu Kamui (神威 勝信, Kamui Katsunobu)
The second son of the Kamui family and the governor of G Prefecture. He is weak-minded and only thinks about his own self-preservation. Unlike Katsuteru and Katsuyuki, his spirit is still in the realm of the everyman. He is the only one of his older brothers who is not depicted as bullying Katsuhiro in the past.
Katsuyuki Kamui (神威 勝幸, Kamui Katsuyuki)
The third son of the Kamui family and the president of Kamuy, a major consumer electronics manufacturer. He was told by Katsuhiro that he would make him one of the surviving siblings because he once ran away from home with Katsuhiro when he failed his university entrance examinations, but in reality he was hated because he treated Katsuhiro coldly after the runaway was over.
Katsuhiro Kamui (神威 勝広, Kamui Katsuhiro)
The fourth son of the Kamui family. He was subjected to bizarre discrimination in his family for more than 20 years due to his poor performance. Together with Kunio, he plots revenge against Hidemine and his brothers.
Kunio Yoshizumi (吉住 邦男, Yoshizumi Kunio)
The fifth son of the Kamui family, who is a half-brother to the above-mentioned brothers and has been kept a secret from everyone around him. He was confined and abused at an early age because he had a mild brain injury and could not go to school, currently living as a manservant. He had never received any affection from anyone but his mother and Katsuhiro. Together with Katsuhiro, they decide to take revenge on the Kamui family.
Saori Tanaka (田中 沙織, Tanaka Saori)
The nurse in charge of Hidemine who was locked up in the hospital. She becomes Morita's sidekick in the Hidemine rescue mission and takes the lead, but behind the scenes, she is teaming up with the Kamui brothers to lure Hidemine out.
Yukinori Okabe (岡部 幸範, Okabe Yukinori)
The strongest horseman in Japan with an unprecedented 2,000 victories. He is antagonistic towards Kōno, who has a penchant for money and power, but he initially tries to stop what appeared to be a reckless contest with Kōno. He resonates with Ginji's persuasion and sides with Ginji's camp.
Yōichi Kōno (河野 洋一, Kōno Yōichi)
The last boss of the story. He is president of the Constitutional Democratic Party (modeled after the Liberal Democratic Party) and boss of the agro-industrialists. He joins Ginji in a horse race to become the next prime minister.

== Media ==
=== Manga ===
==== Volumes ====
No.	Release date	ISBN
1	July 17, 1992	4-575-81810-0
1. "Fraudulent Loans" (不正融資, Fuseiyūshi); 2. "Three Cases of Fate?!" (運命は三つ!?, Unmei wa mittsu!?); 3. "Final Dealings" (最後の取引き, Saigo no torihiki); 4. "The Compensation of 50 Million" (五千万の代償, Gosenman no daishō); 5. "The Silver King's Motive" (銀王の狙い, Gin'ō no nerai); 6. "The Mastermind of the Stock Manipulation War" (仕手戦の黒幕, Shitesen no kuromaku); 7. "Stakeout" (張り込み, Harikomi); 8. "The Silver King's Secret Plan" (銀王の秘策, Gin'ō no hisaku); 9. "The Crimes of Megabanks" (巨大銀行の犯罪, Kyodaiginkō no hanzai)
2	January 12, 1993	4-575-81845-3
10. "The Day of the Showdown" (対決の日, Taiketsu no hi); 11. "A Dishonorable Last Frontier" (仁義なきラストフロンティア, Jingi-naki rasuto furontia); 12. "Do-or-Die Escape Route" (決死の脱出行, Kesshi no dasshutsu-gyō); 13. "A Make-or-Break Deal" (一か八かの取引き, Ichikabachika no torihiki); 14. "A Complex Mystery Drama" (複雑なミステリー劇, Fukuzatsu na misuterī-geki); 16. "Great Evil Sleeps!" (巨悪は眠る!!, Kyoaku wa nemuru!!); 17. "The Devil Smiles" (悪魔はほほえむ, Akuma wa hohoemu); 18. "The World of the Pitch-Black Maze" (目もくらむ迷宮世界, Me mo kuramu meikyō sekai); 19. "The Last Bullet!" (最後の一発!!, Saigo no ippatsu!!)
3	April 12, 1993	4-575-81864-X
19. "Killing Ritual" (殺しの儀式, Koroshi no gishiki); 20. "The View From the Animal Trail" (けものみちの風景, Kemonomichi no fūkei); 21. "Returning From the Scene of Carnage" (修羅場からの生還, Shuraba kara no seikan); 22. "A Good Dream Comes to an End!" (甘い夢の果て!!, Amai yume no hate!!); 23. "Find a Sucker!" (カモを探せッ!!, Kamo o sagase!!); 16. "The Underhanded Art of Deceit" (騙しの裏技テクニック, Damashi no urawaza tekunikku); 17. "Eat or Be Eaten" (喰うか喰われるか, Kuu ka kuwareru ka); 18. "Authentic and Forgery" (真作と贋作, Shinsaku to gansaku); 19. "Trap Within a Trap!" (罠には罠を!!, Wana ni wa wana o!!); 20. "Keep Your Enemies Closer!" (敵の懐に飛び込め!!, Teki no futokoro ni tobikome!!)
4	September 11, 1993	4-575-81898-4
29. "A Risky Bet!" (リスクに賭けろ!!, Risuku ni kakero!!); 30. "Crossing the Money Bridge!" (金の橋を渡れ!!, Kane no hashi o watare!!); 31. "The Light and Dark Sides of Life" (人生の明暗, Jinsei no meian); 32. "A Loathsome Life" (蛇蝎の人生, Dakatsu no jinsei); 33. "A Man's Wealth" (男の財産, Otoko no zaisan); 34. "Profile of a Criminal" (不良青年の履歴書, Furyō seinen no rirekisho); 35. "Poker Gamble" (ポーカー勝負, Pōkā shōbu); 36. "See Through the Scam!" (イカサマを見抜け!!, Ikasama o minuke!!); 37. "Anatomy of a Scam" (イカサマの構図, Ikasama no kōzu); 38. "The Brave Man Who Descended Into Hell" (地獄に堕ちた勇者, Jigoku ni ochita yūsha)
5	December 11, 1993	4-575-81918-2
39. "A Frenzied Scattering of Cash" (乱れ飛ぶ札束, Midaretobu satsutaba); 40. "Hellish Gamble" (地獄のギャンブル, Jigoku no gyanburu); 41. "The Cheating Trick" (イカサマの手口, Ikasama no teguchi); 42. "The Wolves' Reward" (狼たちの報酬, Ōkami-tachi no hōshū); 43. "Morita's Gambling Philosophy" (森田のギャンブル哲学, Morita no gyanburu tetsugaku); 44. "To Buy A Human Being" (金で人間を買う, Kane de ningen o kau); 45. "Festering Desire" (爛れた欲望, Tadareta yokubō); 46. "House of Secret Gambling" (秘密賭博の館, Himitsu tobaku no kan); 47. "A Dangerous Bet" (危険な賭け, Kiken na kake); 48. "Headhunting" (人間狩り, Ningengari)
6	June 13, 1994	4-575-81964-6
49. "The Warrior's Mentality" (強者の心理, Kyōsha no shinri); 50. "Gambler's Advice" (賭博師のある忠告, Tobakushi no aru chūkoku); 51. "Am I My Biggest Ally?! Or Enemy?!" (己れは最大の味方!? 敵!?, Onore wa saidai no mikata!? Teki!?); 52. "Become a Dead Man!" (死んだ人間になれ!!, Shinda ningen ni nare!!); 53. "Following the Lifeline to Victory" (勝利への命綱の張り方, Shōri e no inochizuna no harikata); 54. "Don't Let Luck Loose!" (ツキを逃がすな!!, Tsuki o nigasuna!!); 55. "Die Alongside That Flow..." (流れにそって死ぬ......, Nagare ni sotte shinu...); 56. "The Smaller Gets the Better of the Larger!" (小は大を制す!!, Shō wa dai o taosu!!); 57. "The Principles of Gambling" (ギャンブルの大原則, Gyanburu no daigensoku); 58. "A Planned Happening" (仕組まれたハプニング, Shikumareta hapuningu)
7	November 28, 1994	4-575-82010-5
59. "Politics Are Gambling" (政治は賭博, Seiji wa tobaku); 60. "Nagata-Chou Restructuring Scenario" (永田町再編のシナリオ, Nagata-chou saihen no shinario); 61. "Monkey Business" (裏工作, Urakōsaku); 62. "Politicians and Stocks" (政治家と株, Seijika to kabu); 63. "The Devil's Alchemy" (悪魔の錬金術, Akuma no renkinjutsu); 64. "Empire of Ambition" (野望帝国, Yabō teikoku); 65. "The Feud of the Grand Family" (華麗なる一族の骨肉の争い, Karei naru ichizoku no kotsuniku no arasoi); 66. "A Revelry of Love, Hate, and Deception" (愛憎と謀略の狂宴, Aizō to bōryaku no kyōen); 67. "Closed Room Murder Drama" (密室殺人劇, Misshitsu satsujin geki); 68. "Beginning the Rebellion" (謀反への行動, Muhon e no kōdō)
8	May 27, 1995	4-575-82057-1
69. "Warped Murderous Intent" (歪んだ殺意, Yuganda satsui); 70. "Single-Handed Determination" (決めの一手, Kime no itte); 71. "Howl of Madness" (狂気の咆哮, Kyōki no hōkō); 72. "A Choice Between Life and Death" (生死の選択, Seishi no sentaku); 73. "Fighting Alone in the Jaws of Death" (孤立無援の死地, Koritsumuen no shichi); 74. "Dangerous Strategies" (危険な駆け引き, Kiken na kakehiki); 75. "A Desperate Confrontation!" (絶望的な対決!!, Zetsubōteki na taiketsu!!); 76. "Declaration of Slaughter" (殺戮宣言, Satsuriku sengen); 77. "Massacre" (鏖, Minagoroshi); 78. "Diversionary Tactics" (陽動作戦, Yōdō sakusen)
9	December 9, 1995	4-575-82109-8
79. "The Murderer's Identity" (殺人鬼の正体, Satsujinki no shōtai); 80. "Lonely Wolf" (ロンリー・ウルフ, Ronrī urufu); 81. "Dusky Fear" (ドス黒い恐怖, Dosukuroi kyōfu); 82. "Wandering Resentment" (さまよえる怨恨, Samayoeru enkon); 83. "Prey For the Trap" (罠の餌食, Wana no ejiki); 84. "Brotherly Bonds" (兄弟の絆, Kyōdai no kizuna); 85. "Heart's Desire" (心の渇き, Kokoro no kawaki); 86. "The Beginning of a True Nightmare" (真の悪夢が始まる時, Shin no akumu ga hajimaru toki); 87. "The Final Shot" (最後の一発, Saigo no ippatsu); 88. "The Revenge Tragedy Comes to a Close!" (復讐劇は終幕へ——!!, Fukushū geki wa shūmaku e!!)
10	March 12, 1996	4-575-82130-6
89. "The Loneliness of the Underworld Villain" (悪党の背中は孤独, Akutō no senaka wa kodoku); 90. "The Way of Horseracing! The Way of Gambling!" (競馬道!! 馬券道!!, Keiba-dou! Baken-dou!); 91. "This World Is a Fixed Game?!" (この世は出来レース!?, Kono yo wa deki rēsu!?); 92. "Target: Horse Fanatic" (ターゲットは馬キチ, Tāgetto wa uma-kichi); 93. "Abduction, Truth and..." (誘拐と真相と, Yūkai to shinsō to); 94. "The 30 Billion Underworld Race" (300億の闇レース, 300-oku no yami-rēsu); 95. "The Two Bosses" (二人のドン, Futari no don); 96. "G II Takeover Strategy" (GII乗っ取り工作, G II nottori kōsaku); 97. "The Horseracing Community's Blindspot" (厩社会の盲点, Umaya shakai no mōten); 98. "Certain Victory Scenario" (必勝シナリオ, Hisshō shinario)
11	July 11, 1996	4-575-82163-2
99. "Bargaining with a Famous Horseman" (名騎手との駆け引き, Meikishu to no kakehiki); 100. "The Repercussions of the Jockeys' Rebellion" (ジョッキー造反劇の波紋, Jokkī zōhan-geki no hamon); 101. "The Day of the Underground Horse Racing Battle" (裏競馬 決戦当日, Ura-keiba kessen tōjitsu); 102. ""One More" Arima Commemorative" ("もうひとつ"の有馬記念, "Mou hitotsu" no arima kinen); 103. "2.5 Minutes of Psychological Warfare" (2分半の心理戦争, 2-fun han no shinrisen); 104. "The Horse Is Gone...?!" (馬が消えた......!?, Uma ga kieta...!?); 105. "Accident!" (アクシデント発生!!, Akushidento hassei!!); 106. "Turf Pitfall" (ターフの落とし穴, Tāfu no otoshiana); 107. "Goal to the Gold!" (黄金へのゴール!!, Ōgon e no gōru!!); 108. "The Light and Shadow of Fate" (運命の明暗, Unmei no meian)

=== Direct-to-video films ===
A total of seven movies with the title Black Market Emperor: Silver and Gold (闇金の帝王 銀と金, Yamikin no Teiō Gin to Kin) starring Kiyoshi Nakajō as Ginji Hirai were released on VHS and later DVD between 1993 and 1997. The films feature Kōsuke Toyohara as Tetsuo Morita in volumes 1–5, and Ken Kaneko as Ryōhei Kawamatsu in volumes 6–7. In the fourth volume, some story developments were changed due to inconsistencies in depictions in the original manga.

Vol.	Title	Written by	Directed by	Original release
1	"Black Market Emperor: Silver and Gold (闇金の帝王 銀と金, Yamikin no Teiō Gin to Kin)"	Masato Katō	Shun Nakahara	September 22, 1993
2	"Black Market Emperor: Silver and Gold 2 (闇金の帝王 銀と金2, Yamikin no Teiō Gin to Kin 2)"	Itsumichi Isomura	Shun Nakahara	January 28, 1994
3	"Black Market Emperor: Silver and Gold 3 (闇金の帝王 銀と金3, Yamikin no Teiō Gin to Kin 3)"	Midori Kogane	Katsuji Kanazawa	April 28, 1994
4	"Black Market Emperor: Silver and Gold 4 - Hellish Underworld Mahjong (闇金の帝王 銀と金4 地獄の裏麻雀, Yamikin no Teiō Gin to Kin 4 Jigoku no Ura Mājan)"	Midori Kogane	Katsuji Kanazawa	June 2, 1995
5	"Black Market Emperor: Silver and Gold 5 - Hereditary Homicide (闇金の帝王 銀と金5 相続殺人, Yamikin no Teiō Gin to Kin 5 Sōzoku Satsujin)"	Midori Kogane	Katsuji Kanazawa	April 5, 1996
6	"Black Market Emperor: Silver and Gold 6 - Trap of Fear (闇金の帝王 銀と金6 戦慄の罠, Yamikin no Teiō Gin to Kin 6 Senritsu no Wana)"	Noboru Sugimura	Hiroyuki Tsuji	January 1, 1997
7	"Black Market Emperor: Silver and Gold 7 - Underworld Horse Racing Hell (闇金の帝王 銀と金7 裏競馬地獄, Yamikin no Teiō Gin to Kin 7 Ura Keiba Jigoku)"	Noboru Sugimura; Hiroyuki Tsuji	Hiroyuki Tsuji	March 28, 1997

=== Drama ===
A 12-episode Japanese television drama series adaptation with the same title starring Sosuke Ikematsu aired on TV Tokyo's "Saturday Drama 24" drama slot from January 7 to March 25, 2017, every Sunday (Saturday midnight) from 0:20-0:50 AM. Of the 12 episodes, episodes 1 to 3 cover the Stock Speculation arc, 4 to 6 are the Cézanne arc, 7 to 9 are the Poker arc, and 10 to 12 are the Mahjong arc. The series was later made available on Amazon Prime Video US with English subtitles. In addition, a bonus 13th episode adapting the Serial Killer Ariga arc was released exclusively on Amazon Prime Video in Japan on March 25, 2017. A Blu-ray/DVD box containing "director's cut" versions of all 12 episodes, as well as the Amazon-exclusive episode, was released on October 4, 2017. Pre-order bonuses included a mug illustrated by Fukumoto offered by the TV Tokyo main shop, and a B2-sized poster signed by Ikematsu, Lily Franky and Fukumoto offered by Amazon.

==== Episodes ====
#	Title	Written by	Directed by	Original airdate
1	"The Worst Money Game (最悪のマネーゲーム, Saiaku no manēgēmu)"	Junpei Yamaoka	Tomoyuki Furumaya	January 7, 2017
2	"The Mind Game Between Two Evils Begins (悪VS悪の心理戦始まる, Aku VS aku no shinrisen hajimaru)"	Junpei Yamaoka	Tomoyuki Furumaya	January 14, 2017
3	"Psychological Battle With Heretic Politicians (外道政治家との心理戦, Gedō seijika to no shinrisen)"	Junpei Yamaoka	Tomoyuki Furumaya	January 21, 2017
4	"700 Million Fraud VS Black-Market Picture Dealer (7億騙し合いVS闇画商, 7-oku damashiai VS yami gashō)"	Nonji Nemoto	Yūji Nakamae	January 28, 2017
5	"Crossing the Bridge of 600 Million Yen Bills (6億の札束の橋を渡れ, 6-oku no satsutaba no hashi o watare)"	Nonji Nemoto	Yūji Nakamae	February 4, 2017
6	"The 700 Million Fraud is Settled! (決着! 7億の騙し合い, Ketchaku! 7-oku no damashiai)"	Nonji Nemoto	Yūji Nakamae	February 11, 2017
7	"Life-Risking Poker For 1.5 Billion (15億命賭けのポーカー, 15-oku inochi-gake no pōkā)"	Junpei Yamaoka	Tomoyuki Furumaya	February 18, 2017
8	"No-Limits Poker From Hell (地獄の青天井ポーカー, Jigoku no aotenjō pōkā)"	Junpei Yamaoka	Tomoyuki Furumaya	February 25, 2017
9	"The Hellish Poker Concludes! (決着! 地獄のポーカー, Ketchaku! Jigoku no pōkā)"	Junpei Yamaoka	Tomoyuki Furumaya	March 4, 2017
10	"One Draw, 100 Million, the Unluckiest Mahjong (1ツモ1憶 最凶の麻雀, 1 tsumo 1-oku saikyō no mājan)"	Nonji Nemoto	Tomoyuki Furumaya	March 11, 2017
11	"600 Billion Mahjong, the Miraculous Move (6000億麻雀 奇跡の一手, 6000-oku mājan kiseki no itte)"	Nonji Nemoto	Tomoyuki Furumaya	March 18, 2017
12	"The Mahjong Game For 600 Billion Concludes! (決着!! 6000億麻雀, Ketchaku!! 6000-oku mājan)"	Nonji Nemoto	Tomoyuki Furumaya	March 25, 2017
13	"Serial Killer: Ariga Arc (連続殺人鬼・有賀編, Renzoku satsujinki Ariga-hen)"	Yōsuke Masaike	Yūji Nakamae	March 25, 2017

== See also ==
- Gambling in Japan
