= Gothic & Lolita Psycho =

- Japanese film poster for Gothic & Lolita Psycho.
- Directed by: Go Ohara
- Written by: Hisakatsu Kuroki
- Produced by: Jun Nakajima; Hiroyuki Sasaki
- Starring: Rina Akiyama; Ruito Aoyagi; Minami Tsukui; Misaki Momose; Yurei Yanagi; Masahito Okamoto; Satoshi Hakuzen
- Cinematography: Nobuhisa Ito
- Edited by: Go Ohara
- Music by: Bloody Bad Romance
- Release date: September 4, 2010 (Japan)
- Running time: 87 minutes
- Country: Japan
- Language: Japanese

Gothic & Lolita Psycho (Japanese: ゴスロリ処刑人, Hepburn: Gosu Rori Shokeinin) is a 2010 Japanese film directed by Go Ohara. It stars Rina Akiyama, Ruito Aoyagi, Minami Tsukui, Misaki Momose, Yurei Yanagi, Masahito Okamoto, Satoshi Hakuzen and Asami Sugiura.

== Plot ==
Yuki (Rina Akiyama) lives with her father Jiro (Yurei Yanagi) and her mother Kayako (Fumie Nakajima) in Tokyo. Their peaceful lives are disturbed when a group of assassins slaughter Kayako and injure Jiro. Yuki seeks revenge by dressing herself in Gothic Lolita fashion and killing off the assassins.

== Release and reception ==
The film was shown at the Tokyo International Film Festival on October 25, 2010. The film was released on DVD in North America by Tokyo Shock on May 24, 2011 under the title Psycho Gothic Lolita.

The Hollywood Reporter gave a mixed review, praising the film's "lightning pace" and stating that "several sequences involving Yuki and her Lolita garb are subtly witty" while saying it never reaches the heights of special effects designer Yoshihiro Nishimura's films.
