= Boiling Point (1990 film) =

- Theatrical release poster with the film's domestic title
- Directed by: Takeshi Kitano
- Written by: Takeshi Kitano
- Produced by: Kazuyoshi Okuyama
- Starring: Beat Takeshi; Yūrei Yanagi; Yuriko Ishida; Gadarukanaru Taka; Dankan; Eri Fuse
- Cinematography: Katsumi Yanagishima
- Edited by: Toshio Taniguchi
- Production company: Bandai / Shochiku Fuji
- Distributed by: Shochiku Co., Ltd.
- Release date: September 15, 1990
- Running time: 97 minutes
- Country: Japan
- Language: Japanese
- Box office: US$1,471

Boiling Point (Japanese: 3-4x10月, Hepburn: San tai Yon ekkusu Jugatsu; lit. '3 to 4x October') is a 1990 Japanese crime film written and directed by Takeshi Kitano, who also co-stars under his stage name Beat Takeshi. It was Kitano's second film as a director and first film as a screenwriter. Boiling Point is seen as an important first step in his development as an editor and as a director.

== Plot outline ==
Masaki is a shiftless, inattentive young man who is a member of a losing local baseball team managed by Mr. Iguchi, a former yakuza, whose coach is threatened and attacked by a local yakuza. He teams up with a friend to go to Okinawa to purchase guns so they can get revenge. A psychotic yakuza member named Uehara befriends them upon their arrival in Okinawa. Uehara has his own agenda of revenge, and as the story progresses the two boys drift further into his orbit, with unsettling results.

== Cast ==
- Takeshi Kitano as Uehara
- Yūrei Yanagi as Masaki
- Yuriko Ishida as Sayaka
- Gadarukanaru Taka as Takashi Iguchi
- Dankan as Kazuo
- Eri Fuse as Miki

== Production ==
Kitano's trademark black humor suffuses the film in many ways: at one point, the boy finally does get a gun, but shoots out the windshield of his girlfriend's car by mistake. The film also features comedian Iizuka Minoru, also known as Dankan, who went on to become a Kitano regular (Getting Any?) and Katsuo Tokashiki, who is famous for his kickboxing skills in Japan. He also played a guard in Takeshi Kitano's Takeshi's Castle in the 1980s.

The original title, 3-4X Jugatsu, is the final score of a baseball game played in the film. "Jugatsu" (October) was added to the title, because the most exciting games of baseball, play-off games, are played in October.

== Reception ==
Boiling Point has an approval rating of 94% on review aggregator website Rotten Tomatoes, based on 17 reviews, and an average rating of 7/10.
