= The Legend of the Strongest, Kurosawa! =

Japanese manga series

- First tankōbon volume cover, featuring Kurosawa

最強伝説 黒沢 (Saikyō Densetsu Kurosawa)
- Genre: Comedy
- Manga
- Written by: Nobuyuki Fukumoto
- Published by: Shogakukan
- English publisher: NA: Manga Planet (digital); Crunchyroll Manga (digital)
- Imprint: Big Comics
- Magazine: Big Comic Original
- Original run: December 20, 2002 – September 9, 2006
- Volumes: 11
- Manga

Shin Kurosawa: Saikyō Densetsu
- Written by: Nobuyuki Fukumoto
- Published by: Shogakukan
- Imprint: Big Comics
- Magazine: Big Comic Original
- Original run: May 20, 2013 – March 5, 2020
- Volumes: 21
- Manga

Saitsuyo Densetsu Nakane
- Written by: Kenji Yokoi; Nobuyuki Fukumoto (collaboration)
- Illustrated by: Motomu Uehara; Kazuya Arai
- Published by: Shogakukan
- Imprint: Big Spirits Comics
- Magazine: Yawaraka Spirits
- Original run: December 6, 2017 – February 20, 2020
- Volumes: 2
- icon

The Legend of the Strongest, Kurosawa! (Japanese: 最強伝説 黒沢, Hepburn: Saikyō Densetsu Kurosawa) is a Japanese manga series written and illustrated by Nobuyuki Fukumoto. It was published in Shogakukan's seinen manga magazine Big Comic Original from 2002 to 2006. It was followed by a sequel, Shin Kurosawa: Saikyō Densetsu, which ran in the same magazine from 2013 to 2020. A spin-off focused on the first series' secondary character Shūhei Nakane, titled Saitsuyo Densetsu Nakane, was serialized on Yawaraka Spirits website from 2017 to 2020.

== Plot ==
The story depicts the sorrow and hardships of Kurosawa, a 44-year-old construction worker. In December 2002, when no one celebrates his birthday, he suddenly realizes that his life is too unsatisfactory, and begins to feel anxious. Thus, he desires to be respected and takes the opportunity to change his life. After a series of twists and turns, Kurosawa wins the trust of his younger coworkers, but new problems keep following him one after another, and unexpectedly, he has to go through all sorts of carnage to earn his title of "the strongest".

== Characters ==
=== Anahira Construction ===
Kurosawa (黒沢)
A longtime blue-collar worker at Anahira Construction, he has remained a site foreman for 26 years without promotion due to his lack of qualifications and poor social skills. Physically strong but socially awkward, he often resorts to clumsy schemes that backfire, leading to misunderstandings. Despite his cowardly tendencies, he acts boldly when his pride is at stake. Later nicknamed "a natural monument" for his stubborn resilience, he eventually falls into an eight-year coma before gradually recovering in Shin Kurosawa.
Yoshiaki Sakaguchi (坂口 義明, Sakaguchi Yoshiaki)
A younger coworker of Kurosawa. His mannerisms suggest a former delinquent background. Though more composed than Ono, he retains a rebellious nature and does not easily warm to others. Initially disliking Kurosawa due to a misunderstanding, he later befriends him after witnessing his work struggles, alongside colleagues Asai, Arita, and Nakanishi. While frequently drawn into Kurosawa's schemes—often reluctantly—he eventually begins cooperating willingly. He has an older sister who works as a stylist. In Shin Kurosawa, he marries and becomes a father.
Junichi Asai (浅井 純一, Asai Junichi)
Kurosawa's younger coworker, he is immature in both his looks and personality. His hobby is video games and he likes to sing karaoke of Shōgo Hamada's songs. It is later revealed he was a victim of bullying in the past, and shows a great deal of concern towards Kurosawa when he is attacked by middle schoolers. Along with Sakaguchi, he often watches over Kurosawa.
Arita (有田)
Kurosawa's younger coworker. He gets along well with Sakaguchi.
Nakanishi (中西)
Kurosawa's younger coworker. He gets along well with Sakaguchi.
Shūhei Akamatsu (赤松 修平, Akamatsu Shūhei)
A younger coworker of Kurosawa, he possesses multiple professional qualifications and excels at providing precise work instructions. Known for voluntarily undertaking heavy labor without seeking recognition, his humble demeanor makes him well-liked among colleagues. He demonstrates notable decisiveness, such as approving early departure for multiple employees simultaneously. Initially portrayed as Kurosawa's rival, his role diminishes as Kurosawa's story develops further. He is married with children.
Anahira President (穴平社長, Anahira shachō)
The president of Anahira Construction, where Kurosawa works. At first glance, he appears to be a mild-mannered old man, but he is also a shrewd veteran manager who gently persuades Kurosawa, who was temporarily isolated at work, to leave the field. But in the second half of the story, every time Kurosawa is detained by the cops, he is often shaken around, including being woken up late at night by a phone call from the police. His hobby is cycling.
Adachi (足立)
One of the workers sent to the Anahira construction site. He tends to follow the rumors about Kurosawa the most. While making a big deal out of his own misunderstandings, he endangers Kurosawa's position by buttering him up with fear, talking behind his back and looking for opportunities to counterattack.
Ono (小野)
A newbie worker who works with Anahira Construction. In the countryside, he was a proud fighter and delinquent gang leader, and even now he is a headstrong man with a delinquent temperament who is obsessed with being the strongest in the field.

=== Fujisaki 2nd Middle School ===
Shizuka (しづか)
A juvenile delinquent. She and her group of three hooligans first initiate the assault on Kurosawa.
Shūhei Nakane (仲根 秀平, Nakane Shūhei)
A junior high school student. He is a skilled boxer who develops deep respect for Kurosawa after losing to him in a match. Despite his intimidating appearance, he is academically accomplished as a returnee from England with fluent English proficiency. He operates an illegal gambling operation generating substantial monthly income, which funds his lavish lifestyle and connections with underworld figures. Paradoxically popular with female classmates despite his unconventional looks, he becomes a source of insecurity for Kurosawa. In the spin-off Saitsuyo Densetsu Nakane, he appears as a bank employee with a more conventional appearance and demeanor, actively cultivating his social media presence.

=== Miscellaneous ===
Yasuharu Nakatani (中谷 安晴, Nakatani Yasuharu)
A 28-year-old part-time clerk at a video rental store. Fed up with his lazy life, he happens to be present at a diner where Kurosawa organized a rally for a duel with the middle schoolers. He overhears Kurosawa's assertions by chance and is emotionally moved by them, calling Kurosawa "master" and admiring him.
Takashi (孝志)
A junior high school student who is not attending school. He is at the diner where Kurosawa decides he is going to duel and is affected by it. He states that he does not know why he is not going to school, but in reality it is due to bullying and blackmail. Encouraged by Kurosawa's fight, he stood up to the delinquents alone and, with the help of Kurosawa and his father, escaped from getting blackmailed. He later appears in Saitsuyo Densetsu Nakane, where he is Nakane's coworker.
Toku (徳さん, Toku-san)
One of the homeless people living in a public park. He hates being called homeless and instead prefers "hopeless" or "residentially challenged". Despite claiming to have abandoned all hope, on the other hand, he keeps the suit that he used to wear in order to get a job.
Akane (茜)
A widowed old woman living with the homeless people. She has lived an unfulfilling life and always laments that she was not instead named "Okane" (which means "money" in Japanese) when she was born.
Ryōichi Miki (御木 涼一, Miki Ryōichi)
A lazy son of the director of a major hospital and medical student himself. He uses his financial muscle and illegal drugs to control a biker gang known as Gallon Kids. According to Nakane, he is an atrocious man who commits acts of violence to "make memories", attacks homeless people who sleep in parks, and fleeces them of what little money they have. When Kurosawa happens to be up against biker gang members, he leads an army of about 50 men into a struggle between Kurosawa and a group of homeless people. In Shin Kurosawa, he became the director of his father's hospital and Kurosawa's attending physician.

=== Shin Kurosawa: Saikyō Densetsu characters ===
Takeshi (たけし) and Makio (マキオ)
A pair of gay men who are in the same hospital where Kurosawa is. Makio notices Kurosawa's awakening and informs Miki, who then reprimands him for entering someone else's hospital room.
Master (先生, Sensei)
A homeless man Kurosawa meets during his aimless wanders. He is philosophically minded and has a positive outlook.
Kawatō (川藤)
A shopkeeper Kurosawa meets while procuring food samples in a supermarket, and a former fifth-ranked Japanese lightweight boxer.
Kojiemon (こじえもん)
An elderly-looking homeless man. Due to his aging face, he has a poor-looking facial expression and has been described as "a man who showed no respect for thirty years" for his misanthropy and refusal to apologize. He loves water, so much so that he makes it a daily routine to procure well water by himself. His eccentric personality is due to his lack of patience since he was young and blaming everyone around him for his failures in life. He has an elderly mother and sister, but they try not to see each other.
Nobio (のび夫)
Kojiemon's follower. He is aware of his own weakness and has a blatantly servile attitude towards those above him.
Teruhiko Funaki (舟木 輝彦, Funaki Teruhiko)
One of the homeless people. He has a bald head, but is the same age as Kurosawa. He is a great admirer of Che Guevara and considers himself to be one of Guevara's comrades at the time of the Cuban Revolution.
Seto (瀬戸)
A quiet young man who is net cafe refugee. He keeps rhinoceros beetles in the ruins of a housing complex, but he does not know how to sell them, so he asks Kurosawa for advice. After selling all the beetles in Kabukicho, he splits the money with Kurosawa and his friends and leaves.
Misaki (美咲)
A college girl working at the hostess club "Glittering Girls." She has short brown hair.
Nanako (奈々子)
A college girl working at the hostess club "Glittering Girls." She has long black hair. She looks exactly like the girl that Kojiemon once had a crush on when working at a restaurant.
Shōnen (正念)
A virtuous priest. He goes to Okutama to practice the "Earth Conduction" ritual, but collapses on the way from heat stroke and is saved by Kurosawa. Without knowing why, Kurosawa, who pretended to be him, asks him if he is stupid enough to do such a meaningless thing, and he stops practicing the ritual.
Shūzō Chiba (千葉 周造, Chiba Shūzō)
Misaki's father. He operates an aikido dojo and previously arranged a fixed match with the Aiki school for a national tournament. When Koinosuke disregards the arrangement and humiliates him, he attempts to confront the school but is repelled by its students. Seeking retaliation, he recruits Kurosawa and associates to disrupt Koinosuke's martial arts demonstration by posing as plants in the audience.
Koinosuke Aman (愛満 恋之助, Aman Koinosuke)
An instructor of the aikido school called Aiki. He is popular among mistresses because of his looks. He is prideful and narcissistic, but he is spoiled by his surroundings and is also a novice, so his abilities are almost amateurishly low, with most of his fighting results being due to the matches being fixed. He also performs iaijutsu on stage, which has nothing to do with aikido, where he uses hired applauders each time.
Kanbayashi (神林)
The Aiki school's advisor. At the commemorative fencing and judo demonstration of Koinosuke, the winner of the national aikido championship, he gave a speech full of lies and exaggerations to mistresses (madams) who are ignorant of martial arts and fighting moves. He is a realist and works behind the scenes to protect the resources of the Aiki school.
Himeko Aman (愛満 姫子, Aman Himeko)
Koinosuke's grandmother and the founder of the Aiki school of aikido. Although she loves her grandson Koinosuke dearly, she understands the reality that he has no talent for martial arts.

== Publication ==
Written and illustrated by Nobuyuki Fukumoto, The Legend of the Strongest, Kurosawa! was serialized in Shogakukan's seinen manga magazine Big Comic Original from December 20, 2002, to September 9, 2006. (Note: It was serialized until the magazine's 18th issue of 2006, released on September 5 of that same year.) Shogakukan collected its chapters in eleven tankōbon volumes, released from June 30, 2003, to November 30, 2006.

A sequel, titled Shin Kurosawa: Saikyō Densetsu (新黒沢 最強伝説; lit. 'New Legend of the Strongest, Kurosawa'), started in Big Comic Original on May 20, 2013, to celebrate the 40th anniversary of the magazine. The series finished on March 5, 2020. Shogakukan collected its chapters in 21 tankōbon volumes, released from November 29, 2013, to November 30, 2020.

A spin-off focused on the main series' secondary character Nakane, Saitsuyo Densetsu Nakane (最強伝説 仲根; 'Toughest Legend, Nakane'), written by Kenji Yokoi and illustrated by Motomu Uehara and Kazuya Arai, was published on Shogakukan's Yawaraka Spirits website from December 6, 2017, to February 20, 2020. Two volumes were released on May 30, 2018, and February 28, 2020.

In June 2020, Manga Planet announced the digital English-language publication of the manga. It was planned to start on June 22, 2020; however, it was postponed to November 16 of that same year. The platform shut down its digital service on March 31, 2026. The manga was added to the Crunchyroll Manga service in January 2026.

=== Volumes ===
==== The Legend of the Strongest, Kurosawa! ====
No.	Release date	ISBN
1	June 30, 2003	4-09-187041-4
1. "Today" (今日, Kyō); 2. "Hope" (望み, Nozomi); 3. "Offer" (申し出, Mōshide); 4. "Pride" (驕り, Ogori); 5. "Lunch" (昼めし, Hirumeshi); 6. "Petition" (懇願, Kongan); 7. "Sunday" (日曜日, Nichiyōbi); 8. "Future" (未来, Mirai)
2	September 30, 2003	4-09-187042-2
9. "Mission" (任務, Ninmu); 10. "Fever" (発熱, Hatsunetsu); 11. "Unsaid" (不信, Fushin); 12. "Family" (家族, Kazoku); 13. "Nudge" (ツキ, Tsuki); 14. "Driving" (ドライブ, Doraibu); 15. "Irritation" (苛立ち, Iradachi); 16. "Baseball" (野球, Yakyū); 17. "Muddied" (泥濘, Nukarumi)
3	March 30, 2004	4-09-187043-0
18. "Pardon" (赦し, Yurushi); 19. "Fleeing" (遁走, Tonsō); 20. "Declaration" (宣言, Sengen); 21. "Proof" (証明, Shōmei); 22. "Wildfire" (延焼, Enshō); 23. "Head Pain" (頭痛, Zutsū); 24. "School Gate" (門前, Monzen); 25. "Meeting Again" (再会, Saikai)
4	October 29, 2004	4-09-187044-9
26. "Ignition" (発火, Hakka); 27. "Encouragement" (呼び水, Yobimizu); 28. "Nakane" (仲根); 29. "Defense" (防御, Bōgyo); 30. "Collision" (衝突, Shōtotsu); 31. "Step Up" (踏み込み, Fumikomi); 32. "Scramble" (背走, Haisō); 33. "Critical Mass" (臨界点, Rinkaiten)
5	November 30, 2004	4-09-187045-7
34. "Relic" (遺物, Ibutsu); 35. "Libations" (美酒, Bishu); 36. "Chains" (連鎖, Rensa); 37. "Leaving the Nest" (巣立ち, Sudachi); 38. "Stick" (角材, Kakuzai); 39. "Label" (レッテル, Retteru); 40. "Brothers" (兄弟, Kyōdai); 41. "Azabu" (麻布)
6	May 30, 2005	4-09-187046-5
42. "Paradise" (楽園, Rakuen); 43. "Closet" (小部屋, Kobeya); 44. "After Party" (宴のあと, Utage no Ato); 45. "Discussion" (相談, Sōdan); 46. "Drunk Samurai" (酔い侍, Yoi Samurai); 47. "Decision" (決意, Ketsui); 48. "All on the Line" (決死, Kesshi); 49. "Lethal Human" (人間兇器, Ningen Kyōki)
7	October 28, 2005	4-09-187047-3
50. "Punishment" (制裁, Seisai); 51. "Tribute" (貢ぎ物, Mitsugimono); 52. "Surprise Attack" (奇襲, Kishū); 53. "Suspect" (容疑者, Yōgisha); 54. "Case Closed" (名探偵, Meitantei); 55. "Sharp Words" (啖呵, Tanka); 56. "Attackers" (犯人, Hannin); 57. "True Attackers" (真犯人, Shinhannin)
8	February 28, 2006	4-09-180206-0
58. "Faction" (派閥, Habatsu); 59. "Fail" (落下, Rakka); 60. "Transformation" (変身, Henshin); 61. "Nobunaga" (信長); 62. "Convening" (召集, Shōshū); 63. "The Battle of Akagi" (「赤城」の変, Akagi no Hen); 64. "Control" (制圧, Seiatsu); 65. "Revenge" (報復, Hōfuku)
9	July 28, 2006	4-09-180590-6
66. "Reward" (報酬, Hōshū); 67. "Easy Breathing" (安息, Ansoku); 68. "Hopeless" (絶望, Zetsubō); 69. "New Man" (新人, Shinjin); 70. "Stomping Suits" (土足, Dosoku); 71. "Declaration" (布告, Fukoku); 72. "Responsibility" (責任, Sekinin); 73. "Prospects" (勝算, Shōsan)
10	November 30, 2006	4-09-180800-X
74. "Morale" (士気, Shiki); 75. "Indecisive" (惑い, Madoi); 76. "Mustering" (戦支度, Ikusa-jitaku); 77. "Akane" (茜); 78. "Goodbyes" (別れ, Wakare); 79. "A Tale" (物語, Monogatari); 80. "Exalting" (昂揚, Shukushō-kai); 81. "Vroom" (パラララ, Pararara)
11	November 30, 2006	4-09-180802-6
82. "Beginnings" (端緒, Tansho); 83. "Charge" (突進, Tosshin); 84. "Main Army" (本陣, Honjin); 85. "Immortal" (不死身, Fujimi); 86. "Scene of Disaster" (惨状, Sanjō); 87. "Action" (決起, Kekki); 88. "Retreat" (敗走, Haisō); 89. "Victory Party" (祝勝会, Shukushō-kai); 90. "Everyone" (みんな, Minna)

==== Shin Kurosawa: Saikyō Densetsu ====
No.	Release date	ISBN
1	November 29, 2013	978-4-09-185688-3
1. "Legend" (伝説, Densetsu); 2. "Revival" (復活, Fukkatsu); 3. "Waking Up" (目覚め, Mezame); 4. "Getting Up" (起床, Kishō); 5. "Old Friends" (旧交, Kyūkō); 6. "Visiting" (見舞い, Mimai); 7. "Clara" (クララ, Kurara); 8. "Competition" (緒戦, Shosen)
2	May 3, 2014	978-4-09-186224-2
9. "Mamoru" (マモル); 10. "Notice" (宣告, Senkoku); 11. "Strength" (力, Chikara); 12. "Master" (先生, Sensei); 13. "Japan" (日本, Nihon); 14. "Stocking Up" (調達, Chōtatsu); 15. "Goddesses" (女神, Megami); 16. "Confiscation" (没収, Bosshū)
3	July 30, 2014	978-4-09-186350-8
17. "Fists" (拳, Ken); 18. "Treasures" (宝, Takara); 19. "Oranges" (オレンジ, Orenji); 20. "Prey" (獲物, Emono); 21. "Line" (一線, Issen); 22. "Telling" (暴露, Bakuro); 23. "Cake" (ケーキ, Kēki); 24. "Water" (水, Mizu)
4	January 30, 2015	978-4-09-186764-3
25. "Suffering" (苦行, Kugyō); 26. "Friend" (友達, Tomodachi); 27. "Rescue" (救助, Kyūjo); 28. "Twisted" (こじれ, Kojire); 29. "Mother" (お袋, Ofukuro); 30. "Funaki" (舟木さん, Funaki-san); 31. "Disposal" (廃棄, Haiki); 32. "Guevara" (ゲバラ, Gebara)
5	May 29, 2015	978-4-09-187055-1
33. "Greed" (飽食, Hōshoku); 34. "Compensation" (代償, Daishō); 35. "Revolution" (革命, Kakumei); 36. "Sunset" (日没, Nichibotsu); 37. "Forgiveness" (許し, Yurushi); 38. "Technique" (術, Jutsu); 39. "Plan" (秘策, Hisaku); 40. "Umbrellas" (傘, Kasa)
6	November 30, 2015	978-4-09-187318-7
41. "Merchandise" (商材, Shōzai); 42. "Rhinoceros Beetles" (かぶと虫, Kabutomushi); 43. "Kabukichō" (歌舞伎町); 44. "Crisis" (危機, Kiki); 45. "Reckless" (暴挙, Bōkyo); 46. "Border" (ボーダー, Bōdā); 47. "Youth" (青春, Seishun); 48. "Traveler" (旅人, Tabibito)
7	March 30, 2016	978-4-09-187525-9
49. "Welcome" (接待, Settai); 50. "Appointed Ceremony" (帝国の儀, Teikoku no gi); 51. "The Earth Conduction" (土健の行, Doken no gyō); 52. "Young Men" (若者たち, Wakamono-tachi); 53. "Apology" (詫び, Wabi); 54. "Request" (お頼み, Otanomi); 55. "Brothers" (兄弟, Kyōdai); 56. USA！
8	August 30, 2016	978-4-09-187767-3
57. "Terrorism" (テロ, Tero); 58. "Ministry of Foreign Affairs" (外務省, Gaimushō); 59. "Wabi-Sabi" (わび・さび); 60. "'Frame'" (「枠」, "Waku"); 61. "Homecoming" (帰郷, Kikyō); 62. "From the Pot" (鍋からの, Nabe kara no); 63. "Strategy" (作戦, Sakusen); 64. "Field Trip" (見学, Kengaku)
9	December 28, 2016	978-4-09-189269-0
65. "Disguise" (偽装, Gisō); 66. "Practice" (練習, Renshū); 67. "Flagman" (振り役, Furiyaku); 68. "Starting" (開演, Kaien); 69. "Swordsmanship" (剣技, Kengi); 70. "Apple Slicing" (リンゴ斬り, Ringo-giri); 71. "Dejection" (消沈, Shōchin); 72. "Vilification" (罵詈雑言, Barizōgon)
10	May 30, 2017	978-4-09-189519-6
73. "Interruption" (中止, Chūshi); 74. "Believer" (信者, Shinja); 75. "Demon" (悪鬼, Akki); 76. "Taboo Word" (禁句, Kinku); 77. "Main Current" (本流, Honryū); 78. "Provocation" (挑発, Chōhatsu); 79. "Doubt" (疑念, Ginen); 80. "Battlefield" (戦場, Senjō)
11	August 30, 2017	978-4-09-189628-5
81. "Downfall" (瓦解, Gakai); 82. "Sophistry" (詭弁, Kiben); 83. "Scream" (悲鳴, Himei); 84. "Disappointment" (落胆, Rakutan); 85. "Restoration" (復興, Fukkō); 86. "Granny" (おばば, Obaba); 87. "Ignited" (着火, Chakka); 88. "Myth" (神話, Shinwa)
12	December 27, 2017	978-4-09-189712-1
89. "Indecisiveness" (来る来ない, Kuru konai); 90. "Proposal" (申し出, Mōshide); 91. "Challenge Letter" (果たし状, Hatashijō); 92. "Conspiracy" (悪巧み, Warudakumi); 93. "Special Lecture" (特別講義, Tokubetsu kōgi); 94. "Implementation" (実践, Jitsusen); 95. "Compliment" (世辞, Seji); 96. "Bookmark" (しおり, Shiori)
13	May 30, 2018	978-4-09-189883-8
97. "Team" (チーム, Chīmu); 98. "Initiation" (始動, Shidō); 99. "Summer Fly" (夏の蠅, Natsu no hae); 100. "Hidden Man" (潜人, Senjin); 101. "Toby" (トビー, Tobī); 102. "Perseverance" (我慢, Gaman); 103. "Haze" (靄, Moya); 104. "Souvenir" (おみやげ, Omiyage)
14	September 30, 2018	978-4-09-860084-7
105. "Enter the Coliseum" (決闘の地, Kettō no chi); 106. "Blind Spot" (盲点, Shidō); 107. "Escape" (逸走, Issō); 108. "Hideout" (隠れ家, Kakurega); 109. "Thirsting" (渇望, Katsubō); 110. "Faith" (信心, Shinjin); 111. "Questions and Answers" (問答, Mondō); 112. "Preaching Down" (折伏, Shakubuku)
15	January 30, 2019	978-4-09-860212-4
113. "Molting" (脱皮, Dappi); 114. "Howl" (咆哮, Hōkō); 115. "Ring" (リング, Ringu); 116. "Mic" (マイク, Maiku); 117. "Repose of Souls" (鎮魂, Chinkon); 118. "Battle Begins" (開戦, Kaisen); 119. "Turtle" (亀, Kame); 120. "Second Arrow" (二の矢, Ni no ya)
16	December 26, 2019	978-4-09-860325-1
121. "Careful" (周到, Shūtō); 122. "Mouth-Watering" (垂涎, Suizen); 123. "Foundation" (基本, Kihon); 124. "Pseudo" (擬き, Modoki); 125. "Communication" (交信, Kōshin); 126. "Hard Blow" (痛撃, Tsūgeki); 127. "Destruction" (破滅, Hametsu); 128. "Prayer" (祈り, Inori)
17	February 28, 2020	978-4-09-860579-8
129. "Divine Assistance" (神助, Shinjo); 130. "Fawn" (子鹿, Kojika); 131. "Vigorous" (潑剌, Hatsuratsu); 132. "Clincher" (とどめ, Todome); 133. "Voice" (声, Koe); 134. "Brandish" (一閃, Issen); 135. "Witchcraft" (妖術, Yōjutsu); 136. "Panic" (怯え, Obie)
18	May 29, 2020	978-4-09-860625-2
137. "Fervent Speech" (熱弁, Netsuben); 138. "Bingo" (ビンゴ); 139. "Problem" (問題, Mondai); 140. "White and Black" (白と黒, Shiro to kuro); 141. "Mud Boat" (泥船, Dorobune); 142. "Means" (手段, Shudan); 143. "Magic Thread" (魔法の糸, Mahō no ito); 144. "Pity" (憐憫, Renbin)
19	July 30, 2020	978-4-09-860687-0
145. "Recurring" (去来, Kyorai); 146. "Asking Oneself" (自問, Jimon); 147. "Awakening" (覚醒, Kakusei); 148. ""Dump Him"" (「捨て」, "Sute"); 149. "Chance" (機, Ki); 150. ""Su"" (「す」); 151. "Vice" (悪癖, Akuheki)
20	September 30, 2020	978-4-09-860721-1
152. "Refusal" (拒否, Kyohi); 153. "Supra-Rational" (理外, Rigai); 154. "Toyed With" (翻弄, Honrō); 155. "Him" (あの人, Ano hito); 156. "The Media" (マスコミ, Masukomi); 157. "Ethics" (人の道, Hito no michi); 158. "Return Place" (帰着地, Kichakuchi)
21	November 30, 2020	978-4-09-860774-7
159. "Confession" (告白, Kokuhaku); 160. "At That Moment" (あの時, Ano toki); 161. "Fireworks" (花火, Hanabi); 162. "Clashing Swords" (丁丁発止, Chōchōhasshi); 163. "The Whole Story" (一部始終, Ichibushijū); 164. "Kurosawa" (黒沢)

==== Saitsuyo Densetsu Nakane ====
No.	Release date	ISBN
1	May 30, 2018	978-4-09-189874-6
1. "Craving" (渇望, Katsubō); 2. "Reality" (現実, Genjitsu); 3. "Out of Place" (違和感, Iwakan); 4. "Entertainment" (余興, Yokyō); 5. "Distress" (苦悩, Kunō); 6. "Presentation" (プレゼン, Purezen); 7. "Volunteer Work" (手弁当, Tebentō); 8. "Photo Shoot" (撮影会, Satsueikai); 9. "Future" (未来, Mirai)
2	February 28, 2020	978-4-09-860550-7
1. "Youth" (若者, Wakamono); 2. "Chance Meeting" (邂逅, Kaikō); 3. "Property" (資産, Shisan); 4. "Collapse" (崩壊, Hōkai); 5. "Dissonance" (不協和音, Fukyōwaon); 6. "Excitement" (激昂, Gekkō); 7. "Practical Management" (運用, Unyō)

== Reception ==
The Legend of the Strongest, Kurosawa! was one of the Jury Recommended Works at the seventh Japan Media Arts Festival in 2003.
