= Nobuyuki Fukumoto =

Japanese manga artist (born 1958)

- 福本 伸行
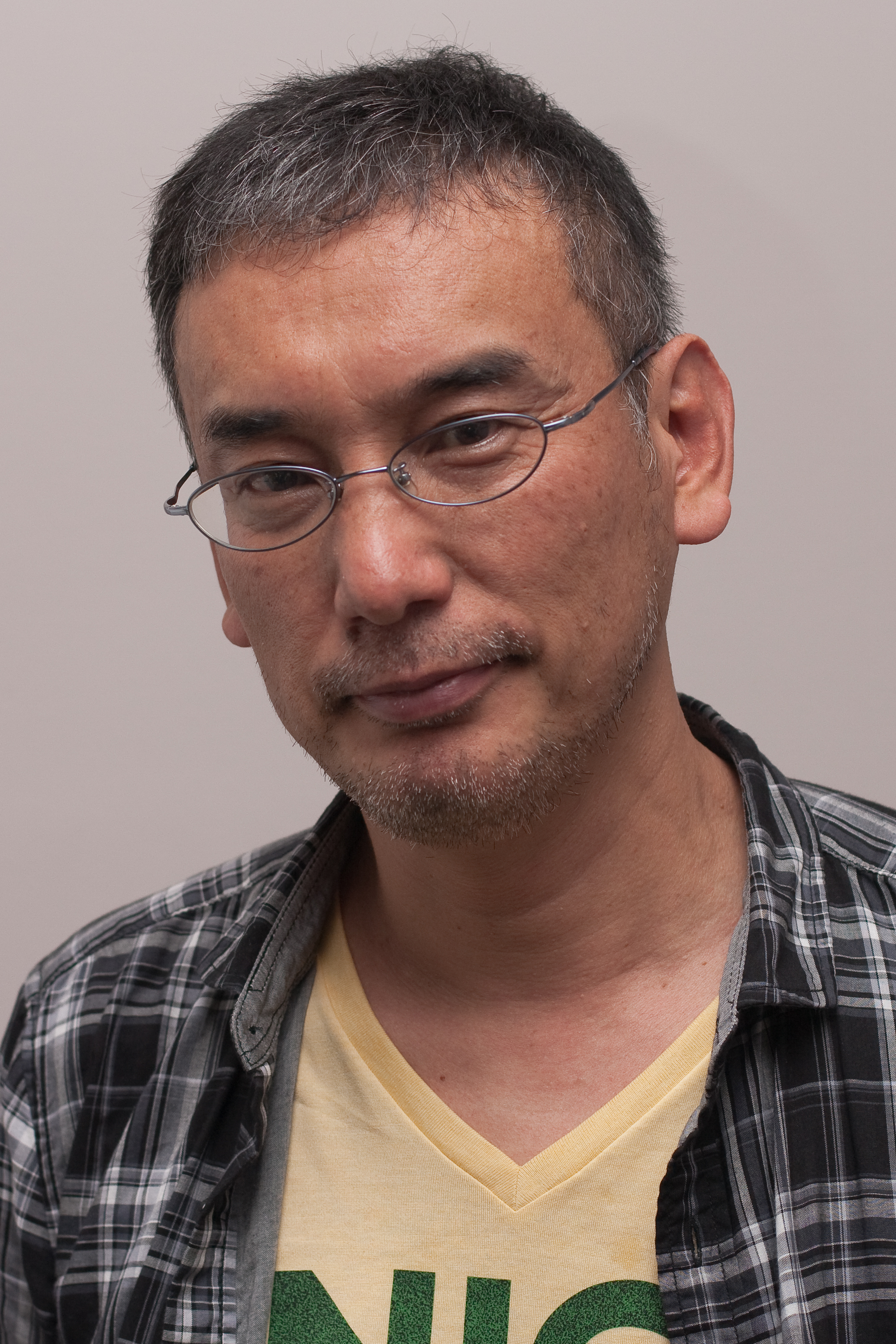
- Fukumoto at Desucon 2010 in Finland
- Born: December 10, 1958 (age 67); Yokosuka, Kanagawa Prefecture, Japan
- Other names: Fukumoto Tobi (ふくもと飛火); FKMT
- Occupation: Manga artist
- Years active: 1980–present
- Known for: Akagi; Gin to Kin; Kaiji; Ten; The Legend of the Strongest, Kurosawa!
- Awards: 22nd Kodansha Manga Award (1998, Kaiji)

Nobuyuki Fukumoto (福本 伸行, Fukumoto Nobuyuki; born December 10, 1958) is a Japanese manga artist, well known for his work including unique and original gambling ideas, deep psychological analyses of characters, and his distinct art style. Gambling and yakuza are recurring themes in his manga. In English-speaking countries, he is best known as the author of Kaiji, a gambling-related manga, and Akagi, a mahjong-related manga. In 1998, he won the Kodansha Manga Award for Gambling Apocalypse: Kaiji. An onomatopoeia, "zawa" (ざわ…), meaning an uneasy atmosphere, frequently appears in his comics and is considered his trademark.

== Career ==
Fukumoto was born in the Kanagawa Prefecture, and grew up reading Perman and other shōnen manga as a child, as well as studying karate and kickboxing due to wanting to get stronger. In high school, he went on to study architecture, and in his own words, he was "a dazed student, neither good nor a delinquent." After graduating, Fukumoto got a job as a site foreman at a construction company, but found the work boring and decided to become a manga artist to try and get a big break in life.

During this time, when he pitched a kendo manga to Kodansha, he was advised to work as an assistant to gain some experience first. He began working under Eiji Kazama (かざま 鋭二, Kazama Eiji), who was looking for assistants at the time, and quit the construction company after only three months of employment, with the reasoning that if he worked there long enough and obtained qualifications, he would not be able to quit.

Despite being hired as an assistant, he was unable to draw skillfully, and was assigned solely to work odd jobs such as cooking. After about a year and a half, Kazama, who was worried about Fukumoto, told him that he was too rough and that he might be better suited to be a truck driver. As a result, Fukumoto quit his job as an assistant after about a year and a half.

In 1980, he made his debut with Yoroshiku! Junjō Daishō, published in Monthly Shōnen Champion. Since then, his work had not achieved large-scale success for a while, so he worked part-time at places like champon restaurants to earn a living while submitting his entries to Tetsuya Chiba Awards in the meantime. In 1983, his work Wani no Hatsukoi won the Outstanding Newcomer Award at the Tetsuya Chiba Awards. Despite having a good part-time job and earning a good amount of money, he chose to make do with manga alone, and quit at 24 years old. One of the pseudonyms he used at the time was Fukumoto Tobi (ふくもと飛火).

During his debut, he mainly drew human drama stories, but in the 1980s, the Japanese economy was booming and gambling-themed manga was thriving, so he began drawing gambling manga because it was easier to get work in that field. At the end of the 1980s, his mahjong gambling manga Ten began serialization in Kindai Mahjong Gold. It became Fukumoto's first popular work and established him as a well-known manga artist.

In 1996, Fukumoto began serializing Kaiji in Weekly Young Magazine. The series has become a hit, publishing over 70 volumes and selling over 20 million copies, sealing his popularity as a manga artist.

Fukumoto donated 30 million yen to the areas affected by the Great East Japan Earthquake that occurred on March 11, 2011, and has contributed a supportive illustration. He has also visited the affected areas to sign and draw illustrations for the victims. In recent years, he has been involved in making cameo appearances in live-action adaptations of his work, and writing screenplays for the second and third Kaiji films.

== Style ==
Fukumoto is known as one of the leading gambling manga authors, and his work is defined by detailed psychological descriptions and intense characterizations. Much of his works depict men in extreme games, which range from modifications of existing games to original ones altogether. The number of female characters in his gambling-focused works is extremely low, although they do appear quite commonly in works that mainly deal with human nature. Later, however, he began Yami-Mahjong Fighter: Mamiya, a gambling-focused series with a female protagonist.

When drawing, he has a unique penning method of spinning the manuscript paper as he draws. In July 2009, he appeared at the "Big Comic Superior Presents: The 6th "Rieko Saibara's Life Drawing Skill Showdown"" event held at Loft Plus One in Shinjuku, Tokyo, where he drew an illustration of Kaiji in his unique way in front of a large audience and astounded other performers such as Saibara and Hisashi Eguchi.

His favorite gambling activities include mahjong and sic bo, among others. His least favorite is horse racing. He has been playing mahjong since junior high school days, and admitted that though he has rarely lost a game when he was in school, his current level of ability is average. According to him, he has "tournament luck" and has even won mahjong tournaments between mahjong manga artists. He has also participated in professional mahjong matches. He played about two games against Akagi and Kaiji's voice actor Masato Hagiwara, who is known as one of the best mahjong players in the entertainment industry, and made Hagiwara say "I don't think I can beat him."

== Works ==
- I'm a Man (俺は男だ, Ore wa Otoko da)
- Way of Men (男の風, Otoko no Kaze) (1977) - Maiden work
- Nice to Meet You! The Pure-Hearted Fellow (よろしく！純情大将, Yoroshiku! Junjō Daishō) (1980, Monthly Shōnen Champion) - Debut
- Go for Broke! (当たってくだけろ！, Atatte Kudakero!) (1980, Monthly Shōnen Champion)
- Amari: Working in the Springtime of Life (青春バイト時代あまりちゃん, Seishun Baito Jidai Amari-chan) (1980, Monthly Shōnen Champion) - First serial story
- Hopeless Katchan's Love Story (いけないかっちゃん ラブストーリー, Ikenai Katchan Rabu Sutōrī) (1982)
- Wani's First Love (ワニの初恋, Wani no Hatsukoi) (1983, Morning)
- Mahjong Graffiti (麻雀グラフィティ, Mājan Gurafiti) (1983, Gekiga All Mahjong) — Story by Tsurugina Mai.
- When I Look Up, I See Tsūtenkaku (見上げれば通天閣, Miagereba Tsūtenkaku) (1986, Manga Action)
- You're on Fire, Pen (熱いぜ辺ちゃん, Atsui ze Pen-chan) (1986-1995, Kindai Mahjong Original)
- Welcome to Harukaze (春風にようこそ, Harukaze ni Yōkoso) (1987-1988, Tokusen Mahjong)
- Ten: The Nice Guy on the Path of Tenhō (天－天和通りの快男児, Ten - Tenhō-dōri no Kaidanji) (1989–2002, Kindai Mahjong Gold)
- The Lesser Emperor (銀ヤンマ, Ginyanma) (1990, Gekiga Mahjong Jidai)
- You're on Fire, Tenma! (熱いぜ天馬！, Atsui ze Tenma!) (1990, Weekly Shōnen Magazine)
- Tetsu: The Defiant Wind (無頼な風 鉄, Burai na Kaze Tetsu) (1990–1991, Keiba Gold)
- Akagi: The Genius Who Descended Into the Darkness (アカギ－闇に降り立った天才, Akagi - Yami ni Oritatta Tensai) (1991–2018, Kindai Mahjong)
- Silver and Gold (銀と金, Gin to Kin) (1992–1996, Action Pizazz)
- The Man of Truth: Lucky Day Shintarou (真実の男 大安吉日真太郎, Shinjitsu no Otoko Taiankichinichi Shintarō) (1996, Weekly Manga Sunday)
- Gambling Apocalypse Kaiji (賭博黙示録カイジ, Tobaku Mokushiroku Kaiji) (1996–1999, Weekly Young Magazine)
  - Gambling Apostasy Kaiji (賭博破戒録カイジ, Tobaku Hakairoku Kaiji) (2000–2004, Weekly Young Magazine)
  - Gambling Advent Kaiji (賭博堕天録カイジ, Tobaku Datenroku Kaiji) (2004–2007, Weekly Young Magazine)
  - Gambling Advent Kaiji: Kazuya Arc (賭博堕天録カイジ 和也編, Tobaku Datenroku Kaiji Kazuya-hen) (2009–2012, Weekly Young Magazine)
  - Gambling Advent Kaiji: One Poker Arc (賭博堕天録カイジ ワン・ポーカー編, Tobaku Datenroku Kaiji Wan Pōkā-hen) (2013–2017, Weekly Young Magazine)
  - Gambling Advent Kaiji: 2.4 Billion Escape Arc (賭博堕天録カイジ 24億脱出編, Tobaku Datenroku Kaiji 24-Oku Dasshutsu-hen) (2017–present, Weekly Young Magazine)
- RUDE 39 (RUDE（あくたれ）39, Akutare 39) (1999, Pachinko Jidai)
- Outcast Legend Gai (無頼伝 涯, Buraiden Gai) (2000-2001, Weekly Shōnen Magazine)
- The Legend of the Strongest, Kurosawa! (最強伝説 黒沢, Saikyō Densetsu Kurosawa) (2002–2006, Big Comic Original)
  - New Kurosawa: Strongest Legend (新黒沢 最強伝説, Shin Kurosawa Saikyō Densetsu) (2013–2020, Big Comic Original)
- Gambling Emperor Legend Zero (賭博覇王伝 零, Tobaku Haōden Zero) (2007–2009, Weekly Shōnen Magazine)
  - Gambling Emperor Legend Zero: Gambling Spirit Arc (賭博覇王伝 零 ギャン鬼編, Tobaku Haōden Zero Gyanki-hen) (2011–2013, Weekly Shōnen Magazine)
- Yami-ma no Mamiya (闇麻のマミヤ; "Darkness of Mahjong Fighter: Mamiya") (2019–present, Kindai Mahjong)
- Nikaidō Jigoku Golf (二階堂地獄ゴルフ; "Nikaido Hell Golf'") (2023–present, Morning)

=== As writer ===
- Confession (告白, Kokuhaku) (1998, Young Magazine Uppers) — Illustrated by Kaiji Kawaguchi
- Life (生存, Seizon) (1999, Young Magazine Uppers) — Illustrated by Kaiji Kawaguchi
- Kaiji 2 (カイジ2 人生奪回ゲーム, Kaiji 2 Jinsei Dakkai Gēmu; lit. Kaiji 2: Life Recovery Game) (2011, theatrical film) — Screenplay
- Kaiji: Final Game (カイジ ファイナルゲーム, Kaiji Fainaru Gēmu) (2020, theatrical film) — Original story, screenplay
- Aoi and Teppei (葵と哲平, Aoi to Teppei) (2026, Young Magazine) - Illustrated by Takumi Fukumoto

=== As supervisor ===
- Washizu: World of Mahjong Hell (ワシズ 閻魔の闘牌, Washizu Enma no Tōhai) (2008–2012, Kindai Mahjong Original) - Written by Keiichirō Hara, spin-off of Akagi
  - Washizu: The Mahjong That Ruled a Nation (ワシズ 天下創世闘牌録, Washizu Tenka Sōsei Tōhairoku) (2012–2014, Kindai Mahjong Original → Kindai Manga) - Written by Keiichirō Hara
- Hero: A Man Who Carries On Akagi's Legacy (HERO アカギの遺志を継ぐ男, HERO Akagi no Ishi o Tsugu Otoko) (2009–2021, Kindai Mahjong) - Written by Jirō Maeda, spin-off of Ten
- Mr. Tonegawa: Middle Management Blues (中間管理録トネガワ, Chūkan Kanriroku Tonegawa) (2015–2020, Monthly Young Magazine → Comic Days) - Written by Tensei Hagiwara, illustrated by Tomohiro Hashimoto and Tomoki Miyoshi, spin-off of Kaiji
- One Day Outing Foreman (1日外出録ハンチョウ, 1-nichi Gaishutsuroku Hanchō) (2017–present, Weekly Young Magazine) - Written by Tensei Hagiwara, illustrated by Motomu Uehara and Kazuya Arai, spin-off of Kaiji
- Toughest Legend Nakane (最強伝説 仲根, Saitsuyo Densetsu Nakane) (2017–present, Yawaraka Spirits) - Written by Kenji Yokoi, illustrated by Motomu Uehara and Kazuya Arai, spin-off of The Legend of the Strongest, Kurosawa!
- Life In Tokyo Ichijō (上京生活録イチジョウ, Jōkyō Seikatsuroku Ichijō) (2021–present, Morning) - Written by Tensei Hagiwara, illustrated by Tomoki Miyoshi and Yoshiaki Seto, spin-off of Kaiji

=== TV/Movie appearances ===
- Kaiji (カイジ 人生逆転ゲーム, Kaiji Jinsei Gyakuten Gēmu; lit. Kaiji: Life Turnaround Game) (2009, theatrical film)
- Kaiji 2 (カイジ2 人生奪回ゲーム, Kaiji 2 Jinsei Dakkai Gēmu; lit. Kaiji 2: Life Recovery Game) (2011, theatrical film)
- Silver and Gold (銀と金, Gin to Kin) (2017, TV Tokyo) - Episodes 9, 10
- Akagi: Ryūzaki–Yagi Arc / Ichikawa Arc (アカギ「竜崎・矢木編 / 市川編」, Akagi: Ryūzaki–Yagi-hen / Ichikawa-hen) (2017, SKY PerfecTV!) - Episode 2
- ZERO -The Bravest Money Game- (ゼロ 一獲千金ゲーム, Zero Ikkakusenkin Gēmu) (2018, Nippon Television) - Episode 7
- Ten: The Nice Guy on the Path of Tenhō (天－天和通りの快男児, Ten - Tenhō-dōri no Kaidanji) (2018, TV Tokyo) - Episode 5
- Kaiji: Final Game (カイジ ファイナルゲーム, Kaiji Fainaru Gēmu) (2020, theatrical film)

=== Miscellaneous ===
- Akagi "Zawa..." "Zawa..." Anthology (アカギ ざわ・・ざわ・・アンソロジー, Akagi Zawa... Zawa... Ansorojī) (2011, Takeshobo)
- Do You Know the Real Dangers of Those So-Called Legal Drugs That are Being Sold? (合法といって売られている薬物の、本当の怖さを知っていますか？, Gōhō to Itte Urareteiru Yakubutsu no, Hontō no Kowasa o Shitteimasu ka?) (2014, Government Public Relations Online)
- Yamada-kun and the Seven Witches (山田くんと7人の魔女, Yamada-kun to 7-nin no Majo) (2015) - End card (ep 4)
- Made in Abyss (メイドインアビス, Meido in Abisu) (2017) - End card (ep 9)
- Made in Abyss: The Golden City of the Scorching Sun (メイドインアビス 烈日の黄金郷, Meido in Abisu: Retsujitsu no Ōgonkyō) (2022) - End card (ep 10)
