= Dankan =

Japanese actor and film director

- Born: 3 January 1959 (age 67); Saitama, Japan
- Other name: Minoru Iizuka (real name)
- Occupation: Actor
- Years active: 1990–present

Dankan (ダンカン; born 3 January 1959) is a Japanese actor, screenplay writer and film director. He appeared in more than 30 films since 1990.

== Selected filmography ==
=== Film ===
Year	Title	Role	Notes
1990	Boiling Point	Kazuo	
1995	Getting Any?	Asao	
1998	Suicide Bus (Ikinai)	Aragaki	also scriptwriter
2005	Shichinin no Tomurai		also director and writer
2005	The Curse	Male Guest in TV Program	
2008	Suspect X	Kuniaki Kudo	
2014	The Snow White Murder Case	Kozaburo Shirono	
2017	Tokyo Ghoul	Hisashi Ogura	
2020	Fukushima 50		
2022	Thousand and One Nights	Haruo	

=== Television ===
Year	Title	Role	Notes	Ref.
1995	Kinjirareta Asobi	Yuji Kuze		
2007	Fūrin Kazan	Kasahara Kiyoshige	Taiga drama	
2009	Clouds Over the Hill	Ijichi Hikojiro		
2012	Doctor Ume	Inoue	Asadora	
2015	Hana Moyu		Taiga drama	
2017	Naotora: The Lady Warlord	Negi	Taiga drama	
2017	Silver and Gold	Tetsu Umeya		
