= Misaki Momose =

Japanese actress

- 桃瀬 美咲
- Born: Misaki Yasui; March 6, 1993 (age 33); Okayama City, Japan
- Other name: Misakki
- Occupations: Actress, Tarento
- Years active: 2008-present
- Height: 151 cm (4 ft 11 in)

Misaki Momose (桃瀬 美咲, Momose Misaki; born Misaki Yasui on 6 March 1993) is a Japanese actress and tarento, from Okayama prefecture. She is a practitioner of Karate.

She appeared in the Fairy Tail stage play.

== Filmography ==
- Parade - schoolgirl (2010)
- Gachinko Kenka Joto - Azusa Kinoshita (2010)
- Gothic & Lolita Psycho - Lady El (2010)
- Mobile Boyfriend + - Kaori Endo (2012)
- Ima, Yari ni Yukimasu - Orie (2012)
- Zyuden Sentai Kyoryuger: Gaburincho of Music - Lemnear (2013)
- 7 Days Report - Kaori Kudo (2014)
- Girl's Blood - Momomi (2014)
- Alps jogakuen - Nishiki Takahashi(2014)
- Space Sheriff Sharivan: Next Generation - Sissy (2014)
- Space Sheriff Shaider: Next Generation - Sissy (2014)
- Fantastic Girls - Mizuno Sasayama (2015)
- Girls in Trouble: Space Squad Episode Zero - Sissy (2017)
- Momo to kiji - Sakura Machida (2017)

== TV dramas ==
- Pink no Idenshi - Nao Matsuda (2005)
- Arienai! - Mai Touyama (2010)
- Manpuku Shoujo Dragonette - Runa Tsukasagi (2010)
- The Ancient Dogoo Girls - Doji-chan (2010)
- Naotora: The Lady Warlord - Akane (2017)
- Zero: Dragon Blood - Raira (2017)
