= Shrink (manga) =

Japanese manga series

- Shrink: Seishinkai Yowai
- First tankōbon volume cover

Shrink～精神科医ヨワイ～ (Shurinku ~ Seishinkai Yowai ~)
- Genre: Medical drama
- Manga
- Written by: Jin Nanami
- Illustrated by: Tsukiko
- Published by: Shueisha
- Imprint: Young Jump Comics
- Magazine: Grand Jump
- Original run: June 5, 2019 – present
- Volumes: 19
- Television drama
- Directed by: Kazuhito Nakae
- Written by: Junko Ōyama
- Music by: Setsu Fukushima; Harumi Fuuki
- Original network: NHK General TV, BS 4K Premium
- Original run: August 31, 2024 – September 14, 2024
- Episodes: 3

Shrink: Seishinkai Yowai (Shrink～精神科医ヨワイ～, Shurinku ~ Seishinkai Yowai ~) is a Japanese manga series written by Jin Nanami and illustrated by Tsukiko. It began serialization in Shueisha's Grand Jump manga magazine in June 2019. A three-episode live-action television drama adaptation aired on NHK General TV between August and September 2024.

== Premise ==
Konosuke is a psychiatrist who runs a clinic in the back alleys of Shinjuku. He carefully treats patients and gives them hope. Yuri, a new nurse, admires his work but is unaware of his tragic past.

== Characters ==
Kōnosuke Yowai (弱井幸之助, Yowai Kōnosuke)
Portrayed by: Tomoya Nakamura
Yuri Amemiya (雨宮有里, Amemiya Yuri)
Portrayed by: Tao Tsuchiya

== Media ==
=== Manga ===
Written by Jin Nanami and illustrated by Tsukiko, Shrink: Seishinkai Yowai began serialization in Shueisha's Grand Jump manga magazine on June 5, 2019. Its chapters have been compiled into nineteen tankōbon volumes as of October 2026.

No.	Release date	ISBN
1	January 17, 2020	978-4-08-891421-3
2	February 19, 2020	978-4-08-891484-8
3	September 18, 2020	978-4-08-891688-0
4	December 18, 2020	978-4-08-891796-2
5	May 19, 2021	978-4-08-891898-3
6	September 17, 2021	978-4-08-892083-2
7	December 17, 2021	978-4-08-892177-8
8	May 18, 2022	978-4-08-892259-1
9	November 17, 2022	978-4-08-892515-8
10	May 19, 2023	978-4-08-892703-9
11	November 17, 2023	978-4-08-892875-3
12	April 18, 2024	978-4-08-893216-3
13	August 19, 2024	978-4-08-893361-0
14	December 18, 2024	978-4-08-893521-8
15	May 19, 2025	978-4-08-893672-7
16	September 19, 2025	978-4-08-893812-7
17	January 19, 2026	978-4-08-894067-0
18	May 19, 2026	978-4-08-894204-9
19	October 19, 2026	978-4-08-894344-2

=== Drama ===
A live-action television drama adaptation was announced on March 29, 2024. Three episodes were aired on NHK General TV from August 31 to September 14, 2024. The drama starred Tomoya Nakamura and Tao Tsuchiya in lead roles, and Hiroe Igeta, Takahiro Miura, Terunosuke Takezai, and Wakana Sakai in guest roles.

== Reception ==
The series won the 5th Saito Takao Award in 2021. The series was ranked fifth in Da Vinci's Book of the Year ranking in 2024.
