= Yūrei Yanagi =

Japanese actor and tarento (born 1963)

Yūrei Yanagi (柳 憂怜 or 柳ユーレイ, Yanagi Yūrei; born 8 April 1963) is a Japanese actor and tarento. He was born in Fuchū, Hiroshima Prefecture, Japan. Yanagi was originally a member of Takeshi Kitano's gundan. In 1990 he continued to work with Takeshi for the film Boiling Point. Afterwards, he appeared in over eight more films before meeting up with Takeshi again for the 1997 film Hana-bi. His most recent roles have been in horror films such as Ring, Ju-on and Ju-on 2.

He is married to actress, novelist, and essayist Atsuko Kawada. He is also credited as Masahiko Ono or Yuurei Yanagi.

== Partial filmography ==
- Boiling Point (1990) as Masaki
- Don't Look Up (1996) as Toshio Murai
- Hana-bi (1997) as Chef No. 1
- Ring (1998) as AD Okazaki
- Ring 2 (1999) as AD Okazaki
- Ju-on (2000) as Shunsuke Kobayashi
- Carved (2007) as Detective Kubo
- Kaidan (2007)
- L: Change the World (2008)
- The Slit-Mouthed Woman 0: The Beginning (2008)
- Gothic & Lolita Psycho (2010) as Jiro
- Helldriver (2010) as Taku
- Ultraman X (2015) as Takashi Ozora
- Little Nights, Little Love (2019)
- Missing (2024)
- Yuko Side B, and Hereafter (2025)
