= Gambling Emperor Legend Zero =

Japanese manga series

- First tankōbon volume cover, featuring Zero Ukai

賭博覇王伝 零 (Tobaku Haōden Zero)
- Genre: Action; Gambling
- Manga
- Written by: Nobuyuki Fukumoto
- Published by: Kodansha
- English publisher: NA: Manga Planet (digital); Crunchyroll Manga (digital)
- Imprint: KCDX
- Magazine: Weekly Shōnen Magazine
- Original run: September 5, 2007 – February 25, 2009
- Volumes: 8
- Manga

Tobaku Haōden Zero: Gyanki-hen
- Written by: Nobuyuki Fukumoto
- Published by: Kodansha
- Imprint: KCDX
- Magazine: Weekly Shōnen Magazine
- Original run: July 13, 2011 – May 29, 2013
- Volumes: 10
- Television drama

Zero: The Bravest Money Game
- Directed by: Shunpei Maruya
- Produced by: Hiroko Hazeyama; Takayuki Akimoto
- Written by: Shinji Obara; Yūko Kawabe
- Music by: Grand Funk
- Studio: Office Crescendo
- Original network: Nippon TV
- Original run: July 15, 2018 – September 16, 2018
- Episodes: 10
- icon

Gambling Emperor Legend Zero (Japanese: 賭博覇王伝 零, Hepburn: Tobaku Haōden Zero) is a Japanese manga series written and illustrated by Nobuyuki Fukumoto. The first part was serialized in Kodansha's shōnen manga magazine Weekly Shōnen Magazine from September 2007 to March 2009, with its chapters collected in eight tankōbon volumes. The second part, Tobaku Haōden Zero: Gyanki-hen was serialized in the same magazine from July 2011 to May 2013, with its chapters collected in 10 volumes. The story revolves around gambling with high stakes, with focus on competition and rivalry.

== Plot ==
Zero Ukai, a boy who causes a stir as a so-called "Robin Hood" of society, is invited along with his friends to the Dream Kingdom, a part-gambling part-amusement park under construction by the wealthy Muryō Zaizen. Zero and the others are brought together because Zaizen is in search of a "king," in other words his rep player, and he puts all his money on the line in order to succeed in that search, with the reward equaling no less than 100 billion yen. In order to save all the victims of the bank transfer scam with the prize money, Zero takes on the challenge to become the king, but the games are nothing short of the ultimate gambles of life, mind and body.

== Characters ==
=== The Participants ===
Zero Ukai (宇海 零, Ukai Zero)
Portrayed by: Shigeaki Kato
Zero is a 17-year-old honor student from Kainan Junior High's advanced class, ranking among the top three in his year. Calm and analytical, he remains composed under pressure and excels in athletics. He values justice deeply, treating his closest companions as equals and showing kindness even to rivals like Shirube.
Mitsuru Kubo (久保 ミツル, Kubo Mitsuru)
One of Zero's companions initially resents him for preventing his suicide but later embraces their pact, finding new purpose in life. Through their actions, he develops a strong sense of justice and aims to use his share of the bounty to help victims of financial scams.
Yūki (ユウキ)
Portrayed by: Amane Okayama (as Hiroshi Sashima (佐島 ヒロシ, Sashima Hiroshi) in the TV series)
One of Zero's companions wears glasses and maintains a quiet demeanor. Initially self-serving, he pretends to pursue victory like other participants but gradually recognizes Zero's leadership, believing he alone should prevail. Despite Zero's warnings about the dangers of staying together, he chooses to remain by his side, determined to support him until the end.
Hiroshi (ヒロシ)
Portrayed by: Ryō Katō (as Chikara Manabe (真鍋 チカラ, Manabe Chikara) in the TV series)
One of Zero's companions stands out for his heavier build and initially displays stronger selfish desires than the others. Though dependent on Zero's help due to his lack of physical strength, he reluctantly parts ways when urged to leave. They later reunite outside the venue for "The Lost Ring".
Sakura Suezaki (末崎 さくら, Suezaki Sakura)
Portrayed by: Kendo Kobayashi
A yakuza boss runs the bank transfer scam group targeted by Zero and his companions. Granted entry into the "test to decide the king" by Zaizen's whims, he often serves as comic relief but also provides crucial insights that help Zero's group. During the second arc, he partners with Zero as a game intermediary and betting manager, adopting a Kansai dialect in his speech.
Itakura (板倉)
Portrayed by: Shotaro Mamiya (as Seigi Suezaki (末崎 セイギ, Suezaki Seigi) in the TV series)
A shrewd, tall gangster and Keio University graduate, he belongs to the bank transfer scam group and joins Zaizen's test alongside Suezaki. Though treated as a younger brother by the short-tempered Suezaki, he secretly mocks him. Despite his intellectual background, he genuinely respects the skills of Zero and Shirube, despite their youth.
Shirube (標)
Portrayed by: Ryūga Satō
A highly intelligent young boy of unknown age and real name. He maintains a calm demeanor despite his intense idealism. Though outwardly detached, he harbors a fierce determination to reshape the world, even at personal cost. He proposes a secret alliance with Zero to overthrow Zaizen, believing youth like themselves—not figures like Zaizen—should guide the future.

=== The Sponsors ===
Muryō Zaizen (在全 無量, Zaizen Muryō)
Portrayed by: Tomio Umezawa
The president of the Zaizen Group, Japan's wealthiest individual with over 3 trillion yen in personal assets, is an 81-year-old wheelchair user nicknamed "Money God". He organizes the "test to decide the king", gathering blood relatives and powerful figures as participants. Though initially impressed by Zero's group and rescues them, he grows to dislike Zero due to his wariness. A vicious sadist, he enjoys torturing failed participants and believes strongly in innate luck. He maintains 365 mistresses and numerous descendants.
Toneo Gotō (後藤 利根雄, Gotō Toneo)
Portrayed by: Eiko Koike (as Mineko Gotō (後藤 峰子, Gotō Mineko) in the TV series)
A 58-year-old Zaizen Group executive oversees the "test to decide the king", presiding over the Dream Kingdom's brutal gambles. Though he enforces harsh conditions, he judges fairly and recognizes Zero's superiority, showing him particular favor while monitoring his progress.
Jack (ジャック, Jakku)
A scarred old man challenges Zero in the finger-cutting gamble, concealing childhood facial injuries with his hair and posture. Boasting a near-perfect gambling record with only one loss, he faces Zero with unwavering confidence—though his success hides a crucial secret.
Kotarō Shiroyama (城山 小太郎, Shiroyama Kotarō)
Portrayed by: Yuya Tegoshi
The flamboyantly dressed DJ of the anchor gamble introduces himself with an absurdly long pseudonym, though his driver's license reveals a simpler name. Zero suspects he may have partial American heritage. While maintaining a friendly facade for participants, he secretly despises sentimental stories and actively hopes the gambling process will tear teams apart.

=== Gyanki-hen ===
Kyōsuke Yūki (結城 京介, Yūki Kyōsuke)
A collegiate golf champion faces Zero in an early morning match. Though outwardly polite, he secretly holds contempt for others beneath his pleasant public demeanor.
Elizabeth Junko (エリザベス・ジュンコ, Erizabesu Junko)
A self-styled "Invincible Poker Queen" challenges Zero's underground gambling site, distinguished by her sharp canine teeth. Arrogant and selectively rational, she delights in forcibly extracting losers' teeth during her rigged "100-card poker" matches.
Naoki Hōjō (宝条 直樹, Hōjō Naoki)
A 13-year-old boy witnesses Zero's beer-pouring match with an entertainment executive. Inspired by Zero's tactical skill and integrity, he seeks help deciphering "Yukichi's Soliloquy", a cryptogram allegedly left by his grandfather Kijūrō. Though lacking exceptional abilities, he possesses strong intuition.
Sawako Hōjō (宝条 佐和子, Hōjō Sawako)
The senior managing director of Hōō Corporation, one of Japan's leading conglomerates, is Kijūrō's eldest daughter and Naoki's mother. Naturally detached, she shows little interest in her father's wealth and often displays an airheaded demeanor.
Takamitsu Hōjō (宝条 貴光, Hōjō Takamitsu)
The president of Hōō Corporation and Kijūrō's eldest son proposes a first-come-first-served distribution of any discovered family fortune. Leveraging his company's resources and Tatsuki's intellect, he schemes to claim the entire inheritance for himself.
Tatsuki Hōjō (宝条 龍樹, Hōjō Tatsuki)
Takamitsu's 13-year-old son, a prodigy who skipped grades to attend Massachusetts Institute of Technology by his third year, shares Naoki's age but not his intellect. Viewing human intelligence as the ultimate treasure, he aspires to surpass geniuses like Shirube and Zero. Learning of Zero's attempt to decode Yukichi's soliloquy, he enters the competition to challenge him directly.
Okajima (岡島)
The senior managing director of Hōō Corporation, once considered founder Kijūrō's right-hand man, suggests "Yukichi's Soliloquy" may contain a hidden distress signal from his former mentor.
Kijūrō Hōjō (宝条 喜十郎, Hōjō Kijūrō)
The eccentric founder of Hōō Corporation, though octogenarian, possesses extraordinary physical abilities—demonstrating forward somersaults and claiming he could perform backward ones. Despite his immense wealth and quirks, his genuine kindness makes him universally admired, a rarity in such circumstances. After three years of confinement, he exposes Takamitsu as his captor.
Mitsu Hōjō (宝条 美津, Hōjō Mitsu)
Kijūrō's late wife and mother of Takamitsu and Sawako was once courted by Zaizen, but she had already fallen for Kijūrō by the time Zaizen became a billionaire and confessed his feelings.

== Media ==
=== Manga ===
Written and illustrated by Nobuyuki Fukumoto, Gambling Emperor Legend Zero was serialized in Kodansha's shōnen manga magazine Weekly Shōnen Magazine from September 5, 2007, to February 25, 2009. (Note: It finished in the magazine's thirteenth issue of 2009, released on February 25 of that same year.) Its chapters were collected in eight tankōbon volumes, released from November 11, 2007, to April 17, 2009.

A second arc, Tobaku Haōden Zero: Gyanki-hen (賭博覇王伝 零 ギャン鬼編, Gambling Emperor Legend Zero: Gambling Spirit Arc), was serialized in Weekly Shōnen Magazine from July 13, 2011, to May 29, 2013. Its chapters were collected in ten tankōbon volumes, released from October 17, 2011, to July 17, 2013.

In June 2020, Manga Planet announced the digital English-language publication of the manga. It was planned to start on June 23, 2020; however, it was postponed to November 17. The platform shut down its digital service on March 31, 2026. The manga was added to the Crunchyroll Manga service in January 2026.

==== Volumes ====
===== First series =====
No.	Release date	ISBN
1	November 11, 2007	978-4-06-372395-3
1. "That Man–Zero" (その男「零」, Sono Otoko "Zero"); 2. "A Challenge for an Emperor" (王への試験, Ō e no Shiken); 3. "Steel Ball Gambling" (鉄球賭博, Tekkyū Tobaku); 4. "Accident" (アクシデント, Akushidento); 5. "Entry" (入場, Nyūjō)
2	January 17, 2008	978-4-06-375435-3
6. "Finger Cutting" (指切り, Yubikiri); 7. "Abnormal" (非日常, Hinichijō); 8. "The Eye of God" (神の眼, Kami no Me); 9. "Secret Method" (秘策, Hisaku); 10. "The Past" (過去, Kako); 11. "Mysterious" (奇妙, Kimyō); 12. "Question" (問い, Toi); 13. "Triangle" (三角, Sankaku); 14. "Crisis" (逼迫, Hippaku)
3	April 17, 2008	978-4-06-375473-5
15. "Send" (送信, Sōshin); 16. "Down the Drain" (排水開始！, Haisui Kaishi!); 17. "Contact" (接触, Sesshoku); 18. "Quarter Jump" (クォータージャンプ, Kuōtā Janpu); 19. "Audible Voices" (聞こえる声, Kikoeru Koe); 20. "Counterfeit" (偽物, Nisemono); 21. "Next Direction" (次なる方向, Tsugi Naru Hōkō); 22. "Zero and Yamaguchi" (零と山口, Zero to Yamaguchi); 23. "Halfway" (二分の一, Nibun no Ichi)
4	June 17, 2008	978-4-06-375511-4
24. "Doubt" (惑い, Madoi); 25. "Detection" (露見, Roken); 26. "Warning" (忠告, Chūkoku); 27. "Breakthrough" (看破, Kanpa); 28. "Invitation" (誘い, Sasoi); 29. "Passage" (疎通, Sotsū); 30. "Response" (反応, Hannō); 31. "Agitation" (扇動, Sendō); 32. "Claim" (主張, Shuchō)
5	September 17, 2008	978-4-06-375557-2
33. "Rule" (法則, Hōsoku); 34. "Verification" (検算, Kenzan); 35. "Rights" (権利, Kenri); 36. "Outburst" (決壊, Kekkai); 37. "Perseverance" (死守, Shishu); 38. "Turning Point" (一転, Itten); 39. "Frustration" (焦燥, Shōsō); 40. "Construction" (建造, Kenzō); 41. "Unsaid" (不言, Fugen); 42. "Misinformation" (誤報, Gohō)
6	November 17, 2008	978-4-06-375601-2
43. "Double Suicide" (心中, Shinjū); 44. "Ability" (適性, Tekisei); 45. "Advice" (進言, Shingen); 46. "Resolve" (覚悟, Kakugo); 47. "Reveal" (披露, Hirō); 48. "High Pressure" (重圧, Jūatsu); 49. "Decision" (判決, Hanketsu); 50. "Scheme" (画策, Kakusaku); 51. "Personality" (性格, Seikaku)
7	February 17, 2009	978-4-06-375636-4
52. "Pursuit" (追迫, Tsuihaku); 53. "Transmission" (伝達, Dentatsu); 54. "Caution" (警戒, Keikai); 55. "In Hand" (手中, Shuchū); 56. "Reversal" (急転, Kyūten); 57. "Kismet" (数奇, Sūki); 58. "Screams" (絶叫, Zekkyō); 59. "Unity" (結束, Kessoku); 60. "Tenacity" (執念, Shūnen)
8	April 17, 2009	978-4-06-375695-1
61. "Decision" (決意, Ketsui); 62. "Collision" (衝撃, Shōgeki); 63. "Calculation" (測量, Sokuryō); 64. "Present Situation" (現状, Genjō); 65. "Positioning" (局面, Kyokumen); 66. "Consideration" (対価, Taika); 67. "Entry" (入室, Nyūshitsu); 68. "Unchanging" (不変, Fuhen); 69. "Cheers" (歓声, Kansei); 70. "Journey" (旅路, Tabiji)

===== Second series =====
No.	Release date	ISBN
1	October 17, 2011	978-4-06-376135-1
1. "Legend" (伝説, Densetsu); 2. "Scheme" (魂胆, Kontan); 3. "Tactics" (戦略, Senryaku); 4. "Perfect" (完璧, Kanpeki); 5. "Unknown" (未知, Michi); 6. "Information" (情報, Jōhō); 7. "Calculation" (計算, Keisan)
2	December 16, 2011	978-4-06-376172-6
8. "Magic" (魔法, Mahō); 9. "Trust" (信頼, Shinrai); 10. "Conclusion" (決着, Kecchaku); 11. "Progress" (前進, Zenshin); 12. "Opening" (開設, Kaisetsu); 13. "Lynching" (私刑, Shikei); 14. "Pure" (純粋, Junsui); 15. "Formula" (定石, Jōseki); 16. "Careless" (迂闊, Ukatsu)
3	March 16, 2012	978-4-06-376611-0
17. "Privilege" (権利, Kenri); 18. "Offense and Defense" (攻守, Kōshu); 19. "Why" (何故, Naze); 20. "Miracle" (奇跡, Kiseki); 21. "Fate" (命運, Meiun); 22. "Proper" (正当, Seitō); 23. "Blunder" (失策, Shissaku); 24. "Imagination" (想像, Sōzō); 25. "Suspicion" (嫌疑, Kengi)
4	May 17, 2012	978-4-06-376638-7
26. "Hiding" (隠蔽, Inpei); 27. "Anticipation" (思惑, Omowaku); 28. "Battle Formation" (布陣, Fujin); 29. "Real Energy" (底力, Sokojikara); 30. "Tail" (尻尾, Shippo); 31. "Likely Winner" (本命, Honmei); 32. "Seeing Through" (透視, Tōshi); 33. "Devil" (悪魔, Akuma); 34. "Enormous" (莫大, Bakudai)
5	August 17, 2012	978-4-06-376686-8
35. "Life" (人生, Jinsei); 36. "Responsibility" (責任, Sekinin); 37. "Logic" (道理, Dōri); 38. "Choice" (選択, Sentaku); 39. "Careful" (慎重, Shinchō); 40. "Code" (暗号, Angō); 41. "Meeting" (会議, Kaigi); 42. "Outline" (筋書, Sujigaki); 43. "Perseverance" (忍耐, Nintai)
6	November 16, 2012	978-4-06-376713-1
44. "Presumption" (推測, Suisoku); 45. "Mountain Climbing" (登山, Tozan); 46. "True Motive" (真意, Shin'i); 47. "Descending" (下山, Gezan); 48. "Overlooking" (俯瞰, Fukan); 49. "Old Days" (昔日, Sekijitsu); 50. "Impatience" (焦燥, Shōsō); 51. "In a Vehicle" (車中, Shachū); 52. "Memory" (記憶, Kioku)
7	March 15, 2013	978-4-06-376794-0
53. "Prospect" (眺望, Chōbō); 54. "A Building" (一堂, Ichidō); 55. "Development" (進展, Shinten); 56. "Old Story" (昔話, Mukashibanashi); 57. "Rescue" (救出, Kyūshitsu); 58. "Luck" (天運, Ten'un); 59. "Dinner" (晩餐, Bansan); 60. "Worry" (懸念, Kenen); 61. "Impending" (逼迫, Hippaku)
8	April 17, 2013	978-4-06-376809-1
62. "Search" (探索, Tansaku); 63. "One's Person" (身辺, Shinpen); 64. "Hut" (小屋, Koya); 65. "Urgent Business" (急務, Kyūmu); 66. "Aid" (救助, Kyūjo); 67. "Mark" (符号, Fugō); 68. "Breath" (息吹, Ibuki); 69. "Long-Awaited" (待望, Taibō); 70. "Darkness" (暗闇, Kurayami)
9	May 17, 2013	978-4-06-376824-4
71. "Word" (文字, Moji); 72. "Dash" (疾走, Shissō); 73. "Smokescreen" (煙幕, Enmaku); 74. "Sign" (目印, Mejirushi); 75. "Doubt" (疑惑, Giwaku); 76. "Riot" (騒動, Sōdō); 77. "Unique" (唯一, Yuiitsu); 78. "Residue" (残滓, Zanshi); 79. "Arrival" (出現, Shutsugen)
10	July 17, 2013	978-4-06-376864-0
80. "Faint Light" (微光, Bikō); 81. "Desire" (願望, Ganbō); 82. "Viewpoint" (見方, Mikata); 83. "Instant" (咄嗟, Tossa); 84. "Deep Emotion" (感慨, Kangai); 85. "Criminal" (犯人, Hannin); 86. "Anxiety" (不安, Fuan); 87. "Reward" (謝礼, Sharei); 88. "Destiny" (宿命, Shukumei)

=== Drama ===
A 10-episode Japanese television drama adaptation titled Zero: Ikkakusenkin Game (ゼロ 一獲千金ゲーム, lit. 'Zero: The Get-Rich-Quick Game'), also known as Zero: The Bravest Money Game, aired every Sunday evening from July 15 to September 16, 2018, on NTV's Sunday Drama block. The drama stars NEWS's Shigeaki Kato as Zero. After each episode finished airing, they later became available for video distribution on Hulu. The spin-off Zero: Episode ZERO, which depicts the past lives of the characters, also became available on the site.

== See also ==
- Gambling in Japan
