= Nikaidō Jigoku Golf =

Japanese manga series

- First tankōbon volume cover, featuring Susumu Nikaidō

二階堂地獄ゴルフ (Nikaidō Jigoku Gorufu)
- Manga
- Written by: Nobuyuki Fukumoto
- Published by: Kodansha
- Imprint: Morning KC
- Magazine: Morning
- Original run: August 17, 2023 – present
- Volumes: 15
- icon

Nikaidō Jigoku Golf (Japanese: 二階堂地獄ゴルフ, Hepburn: Nikaidō Jigoku Gorufu; lit. 'Nikaidō's Hell Golf') is a Japanese manga series written and illustrated by Nobuyuki Fukumoto. It has been serialized in Kodansha's seinen manga magazine Morning since August 2023.

== Synopsis ==
Susumu Nikaido was a 26 year old man who worked as a caddy at the Sakurabu Country Club with no prior golf experience, but his talent was discovered by the golf course owner, Hiroshi Matsunaga, and was expected to become Sakurabu's first professional golfer. However, nearly ten years later, at the age of 35, he still had not passed the professional test, and is often ridiculed and surpassed by younger trainees, like Yuji Kirishima, and faced silent pressure from other sponsors. However, he clings on to the idea of taking the professional test. Even after his support group cut off their funding, Nikaido continues working as a caddy while aiming to pass the professional golf test at his own expense.

== Publication ==
Written and illustrated by Nobuyuki Fukumoto, Nikaidō Jigoku Golf started in Kodansha's seinen manga magazine Morning on August 17, 2023. Kodansha has collected its chapters into individual tankōbon volumes, with the first one released on December 21, 2023. As of October 22, 2026, fifteen volumes have been released.

=== Volumes ===
No.	Japanese release date	Japanese ISBN
1	December 21, 2023	978-4-06-533976-3
2	March 22, 2024	978-4-06-534947-2
3	June 21, 2024	978-4-06-535845-0
4	August 22, 2024	978-4-06-536593-9
5	November 21, 2024	978-4-06-537533-4
6	January 22, 2025	978-4-06-538110-6
7	March 21, 2025	978-4-06-538793-1
8	June 23, 2025	978-4-06-539826-5
9	August 22, 2025	978-4-06-540480-5
10	November 21, 2025	978-4-06-541516-0
11	January 22, 2026	978-4-06-542142-0
12	March 23, 2026	978-4-06-542948-8
13	June 23, 2026	978-4-06-543943-2
14	August 21, 2026	978-4-06-544730-7
15	October 22, 2026	978-4-06-545307-0
