= Atsuko Kawada =

Japanese actress, singer and essayist

- 川田 あつ子
- Pronunciation: Kawada Atsuko
- Born: 10 August 1965 (age 61); Tokyo, Japan
- Occupations: Actor; Model; Singer; Author
- Employer: Last Scene
- Height: 155 cm (5 ft 1 in)
- Spouse: Yūrei Yanagi
- Website: Official website

Atsuko Kawada (川田 あつ子, Kawada Atsuko; born 10 August 1965 in Tokyo, Japan) is a Japanese Actor, model, singer, and author. She was named "Miss Young Jump Queen" in 1981 by Shueisha in their Weekly Young Jump magazine. She became an overnight sensation following her acting debut as the heroine in the TBS television series adaptation of the best selling novel, Ningen Banji Saiō ga Hinoe Uma (人間万事塞翁が丙午), by Yukio Aoshima. She has starred in several films and television series, published a novel that was made into a film in which she starred, and had several photo collections released.

She has been married to actor Yūrei Yanagi since 1999.

== Life and career ==
Kawada was born on 10 August 1965 in Tokyo, Japan. She attended Meiji University Nakano Junior and Senior High School before transferring to Tokyo Municipal Yoyogi High School, where she graduated.

In 1981, she won the "Miss Young Jump Queen" Grand Prix contest sponsored by Weekly Young Jump, a magazine published by Shueisha. She made her singing debut with the single, Secret Music Box (秘密のオルゴール, Himitsu no Orugōru), released in April 1982 by CBS Sony. The song was used in a commercial for House Foods gelatin dessert Jelly Ace. That same year, she made her acting debut as Hana, the heroine in the TBS drama Ningen Banji Saiō ga Hinoe Uma (人間万事塞翁が丙午). This series was based on a best-selling novel of the same name by Yukio Aoshima, and the appearance made her popular overnight.

Kawada's other major roles include the heroine in The Wiseman's Prank (仙人のいたずら, Sennin no Itazura) (1991), Atsuko in Shufu ken Fukei 28-nen Shinmai Deka ni Meisuiri!! Bijinzuma Satsugai Jiken no Kagi wa Reizōko no Nakami to Ryōshūsho no Yama!? (主婦兼婦警28年新米刑事の名推理!! 美人妻殺害事件のカギは冷蔵庫の中身と領収書のヤマ!?) (1994), Yoko in Rain: Nemurazaru Machi (Rain～眠らざる街～) (1996), voicing Gisuke in the animated Azumi Mamma Mia (あずみマンマ・ミーア, Azumi Manma Mīa) (1997), and Miss Pheromone in Little Spy War: Cute & Aggressive Spy Miss Pheromone (スパイ小作戦〜Cute & Aggressive SPYミスフェロモン〜, Supai Kosakusen: Cute & Aggressive Misu Feromon) (2005). She became a regular on the TBS 1982–1983 television variety show Tanokin Zenryoku Tokyū! (たのきん全力投球!), and has appeared in multiple other series and films.

Kawada published her novel Rain: Nemurazaru Machi (RAIN～眠らざる街～) through Kosaidō in March 1996, and a film by the same title was released direct-to-video at the same time. In 1999, she married Yūrei Yanagi. In recent years, she has worked with her husband producing short films. She is represented by Last Scene, a talent management firm. Four gravure photo collections were released from 1987 through 2000.

== Filmography ==
Main characters are indicated in bold.

=== Films ===
- Sorobanzuku (1986, Toho)
- Yamada Village Waltz (山田村ワルツ, Yamada-mura Warutsu) as Miki (February 1988, Shochiku)
- Bell of Purity Temple as Michiko Katō (April 1991, Shochiku)
- Rain: Nemurazaru Machi (Rain～眠らざる街～) as **Yōko** (March 1996, Japan Home Video, KF-5499)
- Hassenbon: Kasutori Kinema: Urakumachi Yakei (発禁本 カストリキネマ〜有楽町夜景〜) (August 2002, Pal Entertainments)
- The Man Who Wipes Mirrors (ミラーを拭く男, Mirā o Fuku Otoko) (August 2004, Pal Entertainments)

=== Television ===
Series

- Ningen Banji Saiō ga Hinoe Uma (人間万事塞翁が丙午) as **Hana** (April – July 1982, TBS)
- Spring Comes (春よ来い, Haru yo Koi) (November 1982 – May 1983, NTV)
- On'yado Kawasemi as Mamiana's daughter (S2E18, "Chidori Cried Out" (千鳥が啼いた, Chidori ga Naita), March 1983, NHK)
- Gekai Sangatsu Made no... (激愛・三月までの…) as Mayumi Imai (January – March 1984, TBS)
- Taiyō ni Hoero! as Yōko Hirota (ep.591) / Kiyomi Suzuki (ep.627) / Akiko Yaguchi (ep.651) (February 1984 / December 1984 / June 1985, NTV)
- Kaijin Nijū Mensō to Shōnen Tanteidan (怪人二十面相と少年探偵団II) as Reiko Hachisuga (ep.5–6) (May 1984, Fuji TV)
- Ki ni Naru Aitsu (気になるあいつ) (August – December 1985, NTV)
- Birth of a Star (スタア誕生, Sutaa Tanjō) as Yōko Mitamura (April – November 1985, Fuji TV)
- Abunai Deka as Yuka Takahashi (S1E43, August 1987, NTV)
- Gendai Kyōfu Sasupensu (現代恐怖サスペンス) (S3E2, "Daikichi Daikyō" (大吉大凶), July 1988, Kansai Television)
- Cooking Love Story (料理恋物語, Ryōri Koimonogatari) (August – September 1988, TBS)
- Will You Open the Window? (窓を開けますか?, Mado o Akemasu ka?) (1988, Fuji TV)
- Haimisu de Warukatta ne! (ハイミスで悪かったネ!) (4 episode miniseries as part of the Drama 23 series, June 1989, TBS)
- Inaka no Ōji-sama: Sukī e Iku (田舎の王子様・スキーへ行く) (part of the Dramatic 22 series, March 1990, TBS)
- The Wiseman's Prank (仙人のいたずら, Sennin no Itazura) as the **Heroine** (part of the Monday Drama Special series, June 1991, TBS)
- Shufu ken Fukei 28-nen Shinmai Deka ni Meisuiri!! Bijinzuma Satsugai Jiken no Kagi wa Reizōko no Nakami to Ryōshūsho no Yama!? (主婦兼婦警28年新米刑事の名推理!! 美人妻殺害事件のカギは冷蔵庫の中身と領収書のヤマ!?) as **Atsuko Umenoki** (September 1994, Fuji TV)
- Kyōtarō Nishimura Suspense: Inspector Totsugawa Series "The Woman Who Disappeared in Hagi and Tsuwano" (西村京太郎サスペンス 萩・津和野に消えた女, Nishimura Kyōtarō Sasupensu: Hagi・Tsuwano ni Kieta Onna) as Mayumi Okazaki (part of the Monday Drama Special series, October 1994, TBS)
- Azumi Mamma Mia (あずみマンマ・ミーア, Azumi Manma Mīa) as **Gisuke** (voice) (60 episodes, July – October 1997, TV Asahi)
- Little Spy War: Cute & Aggressive Spy Miss Pheremone (スパイ小作戦〜Cute & Aggressive SPYミスフェロモン〜, Supai Kosakusen: Cute & Aggressive Misu Feromon) as **Miss Pheromone** (December 2005, TBS / BSi)

Films

- After School Premonition (胸騒ぎの放課後, Munasawagi no Hōkago) (October 1983, Fuji TV)
- After School Premonition 2 (胸騒ぎの放課後2, Munasawagi no Hōkago 2) (December 1983, Fuji TV)
- The Boys' Squad Right After School Special (少年隊のただいま放課後スペシャル, Shōnentai no Tadaima Hōkago Supesharu) as Nobuko Yamada (June 1984, Fuji TV)
- That Morning, Suddenly... (ある朝、突然に…, Aru Asa, Totsuzen ni...) (December 1984, Fuji TV)

Variety / Other

- Tanokin Zenryoku Tokyū! (たのきん全力投球!) (regular, 1982–1983, TBS)

== Published works ==
=== Single albums ===
- "Secret Music Box / Today Is Sad" (秘密のオルゴール / 哀しみよ今日は, "Himitsu no Orugōru / Kanashimi yo Kyō wa) (single, 21 April 1982, CBS/Sony)
- "I'm Sorry / How Are You?" (ごめんなさい / お元気ですか, "Gomen Nasai / Ogenki Desu ka") (single, 25 August 1982, CBS/Sony)

=== Books ===
Novels

- Rain: Nemurazaru Machi (Rain―眠らざる街) (March 1996, Kōsaidō, ISBN 4331056902)

Photo collections

- Reservation: Atsuko Kawada Photo Collection (Reservation 川田あつ子写真集, Rezabēshon: Kawada Atsuko Shashinshū) (March 1987, Wani Books, ISBN 4-8470-2052-9)
- Karisome no Karen: Atsuko Kawada Photo Collection (かりそめの可憐 川田あつ子写真集, Karisome no Karen: Kawada Atsuko Shashinshū) (May 1990, Bic Man, ISBN 4-89405-024-2)
- Photographs: Atsuko Kawada Photo Collection (川田あつ子写真集 Photographs, Kawada Atsuko Shashinshū Fotogurafusu) (April 1994, Sukora, ISBN 4796201645)
- ALL.A (2 volume set, January 2000, Bauhaus, ISBN 4-89461-161-9)
