= Gamera: Guardian of the Universe =

1995 film by Shūsuke Kaneko

- Theatrical release poster

Japanese name
- Kanji: ガメラ 大怪獣空中決戦
Transcriptions
- Revised Hepburn: Gamera Daikaijū Kūchū Kessen
- Directed by: Shusuke Kaneko
- Written by: Kazunori Itō
- Produced by: Tsutomu Tsuchikawa
- Starring: Shinobu Nakayama; Ayako Fujitani; Yukijiro Hotaru
- Cinematography: Junichi Tozawa
- Edited by: Shizuo Arakawa
- Music by: Kow Otani
- Production companies: Daiei Film; Hakuhodo; Nippon Television
- Distributed by: Toho
- Release date: March 11, 1995
- Running time: 95 minutes
- Country: Japan
- Language: Japanese
- Budget: $4.5 million
- Box office: $6 million

Gamera: Guardian of the Universe (ガメラ 大怪獣空中決戦, Gamera Daikaijū Kūchū Kessen; lit. 'Gamera: Giant Monster Midair Battle') is a 1995 Japanese kaiju film directed by Shusuke Kaneko and written by Kazunori Itō, with special effects by Shinji Higuchi. It is the ninth installment in the Gamera film series, serving as a reboot of the franchise, and is the first entry in the franchise's Heisei period. The film stars Tsuyoshi Ihara, Akira Onodera, Shinobu Nakayama, Ayako Fujitani, and Yukijirō Hotaru, with Naoki Manabe and Jun Suzuki portraying the giant monster Gamera, and Yuhmi Kaneyama playing Super Gyaos.

Gamera: Guardian of the Universe was produced by Daiei Film, Hakuhodo, and Nippon Television, and distributed by Toho. The film was released theatrically in Japan on March 11, 1995, and was followed by Gamera 2: Attack of Legion in 1996.

== Plot ==
A ship carrying plutonium collides with a floating atoll off the eastern coast of the Philippines, one of many incidents occurring throughout the area. As the anomalous formation approaches Japan, a team of scientists led by Naoya Kusanagi discovers orihalcum amulets and a stone slab covered in Etrurian runes on the atoll. During the investigation, the atoll suddenly quakes, destroying the slab and throwing the scientists into the ocean. One member of the team, the Japan Coast Guard officer Yoshinari Yonemori, sees the eye and tusk of a giant turtle-like creature.

Meanwhile, ornithologist Mayumi Nagamine investigates a village in the Goto Archipelago reportedly attacked by a "giant bird". While Nagamine is initially skeptical of the claims, she is horrified upon discovering human remains in a giant bird pellet. Exploring the nearby forest, her team encounters and then successfully prevents three bird-like creatures from attacking another village. To prevent further attacks, Nagamine agrees to aid the government in capturing the giant birds. The creatures are lured to the Fukuoka Dome, where two of the three are successfully captured. The last one escapes to the harbor, where it is killed by the giant creature encountered by Yonemori and the scientists. The remaining birds escape before the giant creature reaches the stadium.

After translating the runes, Kusanagi explains to Yonemori and his daughter Asagi that the giant creature is called Gamera and the birds are Gyaos. When Asagi touches one of the stone amulets, she inadvertently forms a spiritual bond with Gamera. Kusanagi also tries to convince the government that the Gyaos are the real threat, but they remain focused on Gamera due to the destruction that he caused. Now working together to investigate the creatures, Kusanagi, Yonemori and Nagamine witness another Gyaos attack at the Kiso Mountain Range.

Nagamine and Yonemori are nearly killed trying to rescue a child, but Gamera arrives in time to save them and kills another Gyaos, but the last Gyaos escapes the attack. Meanwhile, Asagi discovers that she suffers the same wounds and fatigue as Gamera due to their shared bond. At Mount Fuji, she witnesses a military strike against Gamera. The attack attracts the final Gyaos to the scene, where it grievously wounds Gamera and forces Gamera to retreat into the ocean. Simultaneously, Asagi suffers a similar wound and passes out from the pain. Kusanagi visits his daughter at the hospital where Asagi falls into a coma after saying that she and Gamera must rest.

After consulting with a biologist, Nagamine and Yonemori learn that the Gyaos are genetically engineered and reproduce asexually. They speculate on the origins and purpose of Gyaos and Gamera. Nagamine suggests that Gyaos were awakened by rampant pollution and Gamera was created by an ancient civilization to combat Gyaos. They approach Kusanagi with this information, explaining that the incident at Mount Fuji shows that Asagi is spiritually linked with Gamera. Kusanagi dismisses these claims until he witnesses the amulet's power himself. With Gamera recovering in the ocean, the last Gyaos grows unchecked, becoming a Super Gyaos. Super Gyaos attacks Tokyo, causing many civilian casualties and prompting the government to focus on Super Gyaos instead of Gamera. An attempt to kill Super Gyaos end in failure as it builds a nest in the ruins of the Tokyo Tower.

Upon awakening from her slumber, Asagi warns the others that Gamera has recovered and will attack Super Gyaos. Gamera catches Super Gyaos by surprise, destroying its nest and eggs. A massive air battle ensues and Asagi, Kusanagi, Nagamine, and Yonemori follow closely in a helicopter. Initially, Super Gyaos overpowers Gamera, but Asagi uses her spiritual energy to revive Gamera, who fires his charged-up plasma fireball attack down Super Gyaos, killing it in the process.

Gamera, after using his bond with Asagi to heal her, releases Asagi from their bond and returns to the ocean. While Nagamine and Yonemori predict the possibility that Gyaos or other threats may arise, Asagi states that Gamera will return if that happens.

== Cast ==
- Tsuyoshi Ihara as Yoshinari Yonemori, Coast Guard Officer Third Grade, and 1st navigation officer of JCG Nojima and one of the film's main protagonists.
- Shinobu Nakayama as Mayumi Nagamine, a gifted ornithologist who is also a friend of Asagi's and one of the film's main protagonists.
- Ayako Fujitani as Asagi Kusanagi, a young schoolgirl who forms a spiritual bond with Gamera and one of the film's main protagonists.
- Akira Onodera as Naoya Kusanagi, Asagi's father.
- Yukijirō Hotaru as Osako, Fukuoka police officer.
- Hatsunori Hasegawa as Satake, the colonel of the Japan Self Defense Force.
- Hirotarō Honda as Masaaki Saitō, Deputy Director-General of the Japan Environment Agency.
- Akira Kubo as captain of the Kairyu-maru
- Naoki Manabe and Jun Suzuki as Gamera, the titular turtle-like monster and one of the film's main protagonists.
- Yuhmi Kaneyama as Super Gyaos, the evolved gigantic form of the Gyaos, which is the species of malevolent man-eating bird-like creatures reawakened by environmental pollution and the film's main antagonist.

== Production ==
Initially Daiei Film had intended to revive Daimajin, but opted for reviving Gamera after it was determined there was more interest in that property. Niisan Takahashi who had written all the Shōwa era Gamera films had written a script early in the development process, but was ultimately rejected due to being strictly "children's entertainment". Noriaki Yuasa who had directed several installments of the original Shōwa era films was also briefly considered to return but was passed over for Shusuke Kaneko who had long desired to direct a Kaiju film. Kazunori Itō, who had previously collaborated with Kaneko on a segment of the anthology horror film Necronomicon, was chosen to write the screenplay for the film.

Prior to the actual production, Chiaki and Kazuya Konaka, and Yoshikazu Okada wrote two separate original scripts for this film. Their scripts, especially the one by Konaka brothers which was partially inspired by the 1972 film Daigoro vs. Goliath, was later reused for Gamera the Brave (2006), Ultraman Tiga (1996), and Digimon Tamers (2001).

James P. Hogan's Giant series is one of classic science fictions that have presumably influenced the production of the 1995 Gamera film as it had a great impact on both Kaneko and Itō.

== Release ==
=== Box office ===
- Release date: March 11, 1995 (Japan)
- Budget: $4,500,000
- Distribution earning: ¥520,000,000 / $6,000,000 (Japan, rough figure)
- Release date: April 16, 1997 (U.S., video)
- Lease: $8,670 / ¥1,000,000 (from Daiei in 1997, rough figure)

=== Critical response ===
Gamera: Guardian of the Universe received generally positive reviews from critics, with two out of the three reviews listed for the film on Rotten Tomatoes being favorable.

Peter H. Gilmore of MonsterZero.us said, "All in all, this is a vibrant and energetic film. The monster battles are full of physical grappling as well as energy weapon exchanges, and the excellent suitmation is well augmented by judiciously used CGI." Popcorn Pictures said, "This is just a great, fun kaiju film. ... Gamera finally has a film to rival Godzilla (but he's still second best to the Big G, though) and rid the infamous legacy that has dogged him throughout his motion picture life." David Miller of CULT MOVIES praised the film's special effects, calling the film "one of the best of all the giant monster films".

Steve Biodrowski of Cinefantastique praised the film's "money shot" moments, also saying "supplying the necessary 'oomph' to push this over from being merely diverting to being outright exhilarating". The New York Daily News praised the film's action sequences, stating that the "giant monster movie fans seeking a big-screen treat will find it here". Roger Ebert gave the film three stars out of four, saying that, despite its flaws, "Gamera is more fun" than "megabudget solemnity like Air Force One", and that "Gamera is not a good movie but it is a good moviegoing experience".

=== Accolades ===
Year	Award	Category	Nominee/Recipient	Result	Ref(s)
1996	Award of the Japanese Academy	Best Supporting Actress	Shinobu Nakayama	Nominated	
1996	Blue Ribbon Awards	Best Supporting Actress	Shinobu Nakayama	Won	
1996	Blue Ribbon Awards	Best Director	Shusuke Kaneko	Won	
1996	17th Yokohama Film Festival	Best Supporting Actress	Shinobu Nakayama	Won	
1996	17th Yokohama Film Festival	Best Director	Shusuke Kaneko (Tied with Shunji Iwai for "Love Letter 1995)")	Won	
1996	17th Yokohama Film Festival	Best Screenplay	Kazunori Ito (Also, for "Kokaku Kidotai")	Won	
1996	17th Yokohama Film Festival	Best Technical (for special effects)	Shinji Higuchi	Won	
