= Ruito Aoyagi =

Japanese actor and singer

Ruito Aoyagi (青柳 塁斗, Aoyagi Ruito; born March 29, 1990 in Hokkaido) is a Japanese actor and singer. He is best known for his role as Gakuto Mukahi in The Prince of Tennis musicals. He is managed by Amuse, Inc.

== Appearances ==
=== Musicals ===
- Musical Kuroshitsuji: That Butler, friendship (May 28, 2009, and June 7, 2009) Yuki, Japanese visitor

=== Stage productions ===
- Musical Tennis no Ohjisama The Imperial Match Hyotei Gakuen (2005) as Gakuto Mukahi
- Musical Tennis no Ohjisama The Imperial Match Hyotei Gakuen in winter (2005–2006) as Gakuto Mukahi
- Musical Tennis no Ohjisama Dream Live 3rd (2006) as Gakuto Mukahi
- On Line (2006) as Machi
- Musical Tennis no Ohjisama Advancement Match Rokkaku feat. Hyotei Gakuen (2006) as Gakuto Mukahi
- Frogs (2007) as Amane
- On line Volume 2: Roomshare (2007) as Kuruma Kenya
- Musical Tennis no Ohjisama Dream Live 4th (2007) as Gakuto Mukahi
- Sukedachi (2007)
- Blue Sheets (2008) as Kohei
- Musical Tennis no Ohjisama The Imperial Presence Hyotei Gakuen feat. Higa Chuu (2008) as Gakuto Mukahi
- Musical Tennis no Ohjisama The Treasure Match Shitenhouji feat. Hyoutei Gakuen (2008–2009) as Gakuto Mukahi

=== Television ===
- 24 no Hitomi
- Gokusen 3
- Sunadokei as Tsukishima Fuji
- He joined SASUKE 39 at 28 December 2021. He was given #47. He failed Stage 1 at Fish Bone.

=== Film ===
- Shinrei Shashin Jusatsu (2006) as Kazuyoshi
- Gothic & Lolita Psycho (2010) as Masato Main Antagonist

== Discography ==
- (2006.7.26) Musical Tennis no Ohjisama Best Actor's Series 004 Takumi Saitoh as Yushi Oshitari & Ruito Aoyagi as Gakuto Mukahi
