= Shinobu Nakayama =

Japanese actress and a former J-pop singer (born 1973)

- 中山 忍
- Born: January 18, 1973 (age 53); Koganei, Tokyo, Japan
- Occupations: Actress; singer
- Years active: 1988–present
- Agent: Office Muse
- Relatives: Miho Nakayama (sister)
- Musical career
- Genres: J-pop
- Instrument: Vocals
- Years active: 1983–1995; 2005–2006
- Label: CBS Sony

Japanese name
- Kanji: 中山 忍
- Hiragana: なかやま しのぶ
- Katakana: ナカヤマ シノブ
Transcriptions
- Romanization: Nakayama Shinobu
- Website: www.office-muse.co.jp

Shinobu Nakayama (中山 忍, Nakayama Shinobu; born January 18, 1973) is a Japanese actress and a former J-pop singer. She released her first single on 2 November 1988; her final release as a J-pop artist was on 1 March 1991. She acted in Godzilla vs. Mechagodzilla II (1993), Fist of Legend (1994), Gamera: Guardian of the Universe (1995) and Gamera 3: Revenge of Iris (1999). Nakayama was a member of the short-lived idol groups Nanatsuboshi and Rakutenshi. She is affiliated with Office Muse.

== Biography ==
Nakayama was born on January 18, 1973, in Koganei, Tokyo. She is the younger sister of singer and actress Miho Nakayama. She graduated from Asia University.

Nakayama, like her older sister, Miho, started out her career as a musician. She released her first single on 2 November 1988. Her final release as a J-pop artist was on 1 March 1991. She became successful when she became part of a music group called Rakutenshi. She was also a member of the short-lived idol group Nanatsuboshi.

Nakayama started a career in acting in the early 1990s. She portrayed Yuri Katagiri in Godzilla vs. Mechagodzilla II (1993). She was cast in the Jet Li movie Fist of Legend (1994), a remake of the Bruce Lee film Fist of Fury. She portrayed Mayumi Nagamine in Gamera: Guardian of the Universe (1995) and Gamera 3: Revenge of Iris (1999).

== Discography ==
=== Studio albums ===
Year	Information	Oricon weekly peak position	Sales	RIAJ certification
1989	Kesshin: Released: June 1, 1989; Label: CBS Sony; Formats: LP, CD, cassette	—		
1989	Niji no Lithograph: Released: December 1, 1989; Label: CBS Sony; Formats: CD, cassette	—		
1990	Hakoiri Musume: Konomama ja Irarenai wa: Released: August 1, 1990; Label: CBS Sony; Formats: CD, cassette	—		
"—" denotes a release that did not chart.

=== Compilation albums ===
Title	Album details
Kyō made Soshite Asu kara	Released: January 1, 1991; Label: Sony Records; Formats: CD, cassette
Idol Miracle Bible Series: Shinobu Nakayama	Released: November 30, 2005; Label: SME Records; Formats: CD

=== Singles ===
List of singles, with selected chart positions
Title	Date	Peak chart positions	Sales (JPN)	RIAJ certification	Album
Title	Date	JPN Oricon	Sales (JPN)	RIAJ certification	Album
"Chīsana Kesshin"	November 2, 1988	—			Kesshin
"Namida, Tomare!"	February 1, 1989	—			Kesshin
"Makenaide, Yūki"	May 1, 1989	—			Kesshin
"Natsu ni Koi suru Awatenbo"	August 10, 1989	—			Niji no Lithograph
"Kaketekita Shojo (Otome)"	November 1, 1989	—			Niji no Lithograph
"Hikari no Opera"	March 1, 1990	—			Kyō made Soshite Asu kara
"Hakoiri Musume no Nageki"	July 1, 1990	—			Hakoiri Musume: Konomama ja Irarenai wa
"Romantic"	December 21, 1990	—			Kyō made Soshite Asu kara
"—" denotes a release that did not chart.

== Filmography ==
=== Film ===
Year	Title	Role	Notes	Ref.
1990	Anxious Virgin: One More Time, I Love You	Sachiko	Lead role	
1993	Godzilla vs. Mechagodzilla II	Yuri Katagiri		
1994	Fist of Legend	Mitsuko Yamada		
1995	Gamera: Guardian of the Universe	Mayumi Nagamine		
1996	The Donor	Yuka Yamashina	Lead role	
1999	Gamera 3: Revenge of Iris	Mayumi Nagamine		
2006	The Ode to Joy	Matsu		
2023	After-school Angler Life for High School Girls.			
2025	Sōzoku	Sanae Suzuki		
2026	Aoike Haruka no Jiken Channel			
2026	Goodbye My Car	Haruka Nanjo		

=== Television ===
Year	Title	Role	Notes	Ref.
2005	Ōoku	Ōsuke	Season 3	
2024	Wing-Man	Yoshiko Hirono		
