= Sakura no Sono =

1985–1986 manga series by Akimi Yoshida

- Cover of the 1994 bunkoban re-release

櫻の園
- Manga
- Written by: Akimi Yoshida
- Published by: Hakusensha
- Magazine: LaLa
- Original run: 1985 – 1986
- Live-action film
- Directed by: Shun Nakahara
- Studio: Nikkatsu Studio
- Released: November 3, 1990
- Live-action film
- Released: November 2008
- Theatre series
- Three stage productions have been adapted: one in 1994, one in 2007, and one in 2009.

Sakura no Sono (櫻の園; "Cherry Blossom Garden") is a Japanese manga series written and illustrated by Akimi Yoshida. It was serialized from 1985 to 1986 in Hakusensha's manga magazine LaLa. The story focuses on individuals from a drama club that are putting on Anton Chekhov's 1904 play The Cherry Orchard.

The manga was adapted into a film in 1990 by Shun Nakahara, and a remake was released in November 2008. Theatrical stage productions debuted at the Tokyo Metropolitan Art Space in 1994 and at the Aoyama Round Theatre in 2007 and 2009.

== Plot ==
The drama club of Oka Academy an all-girls high school put on the play The Cherry Orchard by Anton Chekhov for the anniversary of the school's founding. Each chapter follows the life of one of the club members while the preparations for the play go on.

== Characters ==
Atsuko Nakano (中野 敦子, Nakano Atsuko)
Atsuko is dating Shinichi Sakata, a boy on the rugby team at another high school, and worries about progressing their relationship.
Noriko Sugiyama (杉山 紀子, Sugiyama Noriko)
A girl who did not want to come to an all-girls high school, Noriko becomes friends with Yuko after she stood up to fellow clubs members spreading rumours about her.
Yuko Shimizu (志水 由布子, Shimizu Yuko)
The president of the drama club, is seen by other members as having it together and is always addressed using polite Japanese because of it. Due to being teased when she was younger Yuko has a dislike for men.
Kurata Chiyoko (倉田 知世子, Chiyoko Kurata)
A close friend of Atsuko, Kurata is troubled by her height and femininity. She is popular with the girls at school for playing the role of a male character the year before.
Sakata Shinichi (坂田 シンイチ, Shinichi Sakata)
Atsuko's boyfriend, plays rugby for another high school.

== Media ==
=== Live-action films ===
The manga was adapted into a film in 1990 by Shun Nakahara (English title The Cherry Orchard). A remake was announced in 2007 by the same director and was released in November 2008. The plot is similar to the original manga, in which a modern-day all-girls high school traditionally celebrates its anniversary by staging Chekov's play, but the faculty consider canceling the play because Noriko, a senior, was seen smoking in a coffee shop with students from a rival school. The 1990 film uses a recording of Variations on a Theme of Chopin by Mari Kumamoto as the soundtrack throughout the film.

=== Theatre series ===
Two stage productions have been adapted, one at the Tokyo Metropolitan Art Space in 1994 and another at the Aoyama Round Theatre in 2007 and 2009.

== Reception ==
James Welker thinks the manga "could be included in the lesbian manga canon." Yukari Fujimoto notes the Class S-like setting of Sakura no Sono. The 1990 film won the Best Film awards at the 15th Hochi Film Award and at the 12th Yokohama Film Festival and it was nominated for Best Film at the 14th Japan Academy Prize.
