= Shichinin no Tomurai =

Japanese film

Shichinin No Tomurai
- Directed by: Dankan
- Written by: Dankan
- Produced by: Masayuki Mori; Takio Yoshida
- Starring: Dankan; Hitomi Takahashi; Pepe Hozumi; Yoshiki Arizono
- Cinematography: Shigeki Muramo
- Edited by: Yoshinori Oota
- Music by: Suguru Matsutani
- Distributed by: Bandai Visual
- Release date: August 13, 2005
- Running time: 107 minutes
- Country: Japan
- Language: Japanese

The Innocent Seven (七人の弔, Shichinin no Tomurai) is a 2005 Japanese film written and directed by Dankan. It tells the story of seven families at a summer camp where the parents are involved in a very dark organ trafficking deal. The official English site states it is based on true events.
