= Pop Team Epic =

Surreal comedy webcomic and digital manga series

- Volume 1 cover featuring Popuko (left) and Pipimi (right) giving the finger.

ポプテピピック (Poputepipikku)
- Genre: Surreal comedy
- Manga
- Written by: Bkub Okawa
- Published by: Takeshobo
- English publisher: NA: Vertical
- Magazine: Manga Life Win
- Original run: August 29, 2014 – present
- Volumes: 8
- Anime television series
- Directed by: Jun Aoki; Aoi Umeki (season 1)
- Produced by: Kotaro Sudo
- Written by: Jun Aoki; Yūichirō Kido (season 1)
- Music by: Gin (BUSTED ROSE)
- Studio: Kamikaze Douga (Note: Soyokaze Douga (そよ風動画) in Hoshiiro Girldrop); Space Neko Company (Note: Space Cat Company in the Toonami version) (season 2)
- Licensed by: NA: Crunchyroll (streaming, TV licensing, home video); Digital Media Rights (streaming); Sentai Filmworks (streaming, merchandise)
- Original network: Tokyo MX, BS11, AT-X, Tochigi TV, RCC, MBS, Nippon TV, HTB
- English network: SEA: Aniplus Asia; US: Adult Swim (Toonami)
- Original run: January 7, 2018 – December 18, 2022
- Episodes: 26
- icon

Pop Team Epic (Japanese: ポプテピピック, Hepburn: Poputepipikku) is a Japanese four-panel surreal comedy webcomic and digital manga series written and illustrated by Bkub Okawa (alternatively romanized as "Bukubu Okawa"), which started serialization on Takeshobo's Manga Life Win website in August 2014. Takeshobo has released eight volumes in Japan. The manga is licensed in North America by Vertical.

The manga chronicles the misadventures of two 14-year-old girls named Popuko and Pipimi, who encounter a variety of both mundane and bizarre situations and respond to them in equally bizarre and exaggerated ways. The manga is noted for its frequent parodies of pop culture and its combination of surrealism, absurdity, and non-sequitur, all of which have contributed to it developing a cult following among both Japanese and Western audiences. An anime television series adaptation animated by Kamikaze Douga and produced by King Records (Note: Shimin Records (市民レコード, Citizen Records) in Hoshiiro Girldrop) aired on Tokyo MX and other channels from January 7, 2018, to December 18, 2022, for two seasons. The first season concluded on March 25, 2018, and two special episodes aired on April 1, 2019. The second season was co-produced by Space Neko Company and premiered on October 2, 2022.

== Characters ==
Popuko (ポプ子)
One of two protagonists. A quick-tempered, short, blondish orange-haired school girl.

Episode	Japanese voice actor	English voice actor	Notes
1 S1–1	Masashi Ebara, Yūji Mitsuya (original); Mami Koyama, Ryūsei Nakao (Repeat)	Christopher R. Sabat, Justin Briner	
2 S1–2	Aoi Yūki, Toshio Furukawa (original); Sumire Morohoshi, Tesshō Genda (Repeat)	Trina Nishimura, Sonny Strait	
3 S1–3	Mikako Komatsu, Ryūsei Nakao (original); Eriko Nakamura, Sōma Saitō (Repeat)	Sarah Wiedenheft, Barry Yandell	Pop Team Epic Kinen
4 S1–4	Yōko Hikasa, Tesshō Genda (original); Sora Tokui, Showtaro Morikubo (Repeat)	Jad Saxton, Alejandro Saab	
5 S1–5	Tomoko Kaneda, Yūichi Nakamura (original); Yūko Sanpei, Hiro Shimono (Repeat)	Cherami Leigh, Eric Vale	
6 S1–6	Yūko Sanpei, Hiro Shimono (original); Nana Mizuki, Masaya Onosaka (Repeat)	Brittney Karbowski, Todd Haberkorn	
7 S1–7	Satomi Kōrogi, Showtaro Morikubo, Shunsuke Itakura (AC-bu), Tōru Adachi (AC-bu) (Pop Team Story)	Alison Viktorin, Greg Ayres	
8 S1–8	Sumire Morohoshi, Masaya Onosaka	Stephanie Sheh, Johnny Yong Bosch	
9 S1–9	Eriko Nakamura, Sōma Saitō; Tomoko Kaneda, Yūichi Nakamura (Repeat)	Alexis Tipton, Justin Cook	
10; S1–10	Sora Tokui, Rikiya Koyama	Emily Neves, Cris George	
11; S1–11	Nana Mizuki, Hozumi Gōda	Wendy Powell, Sean Schemmel	
12; S1–12	Mami Koyama, Shō Hayami	Mikaela Krantz, Micah Solusod	
13; SP–1	Yukari Tamura, Sōichirō Hoshi (Blue Dragon), Kana Hanazawa, Kappei Yamaguchi (White Tiger), Sakiko Tamagawa, Yūki Ono (Vermilion Bird), Yumiri Hanamori, Takahiro Sakurai (Black Tortoise) (Note: Episodes 13 and 14 aired in four different versions, titled Blue Dragon (青龍, Seiryū), Vermilion Bird (朱雀, Suzaku), White Tiger (白虎, Byakko), and Black Tortoise (玄武, Genbu), which each aired on different networks and streaming services and featured different voices. The English dub uses the Blue Dragon version.)	Bryn Apprill, Bryce Papenbrook	Special
14; SP–2	Mariko Kouda, Nobuo Tobita (Blue Dragon), Emiri Katō, Tomokazu Seki (White Tiger), Junko Takeuchi, Toshihiko Seki (Vermilion Bird), Etsuko Kozakura, Hikaru Midorikawa (Black Tortoise)	Erica Mendez, Austin Tindle	Special
15; S2–1	Aya Hirano, Kazuhiko Inoue	Gwendolyn Lau, Bill Jenkins	
16; S2–2	Romi Park, Nobuyuki Hiyama	TBA	
17; S2–3	Ikue Ōtani, Junya Enoki	Aaron Dismuke	
18; S2–4	Megumi Han, Hiroya Ishimaru	Cristina Valenzuela, Ryan Colt Levy	
19; S2–5	Junko Minagawa, Toshiyuki Toyonaga	Macy Anne Johnson, Derick Snow	
20; S2–6	Mayumi Iizuka, Tasuku Hatanaka	TBA	
21; S2–7	Shunsuke Itakura (AC-bu), Koichi Yamadera	Christopher R. Sabat, Jim Foronda	Team AC special
22; S2–8	Asami Sanada, Kenyu Horiuchi	Jenny Yokobori, Christopher Wehkamp	
23; S2–9	Megumi Ogata, Fumihiko Tachiki	Suzie Yeung, Ray Chase	
24; S2–10	Kumiko Watanabe, Nobuhiko Okamoto	Katelyn Barr, Ciarán Strange	
25; S2-11	Aki Toyosaki, Takaya Kuroda	TBA	

- Bob Epic Team segments: Voiced by: Shunsuke Itakura (AC-bu) (#1 - #6, #8 - #12, #14),
  Shunsuke Itakura (AC-bu), Tōru Adachi (AC-bu) (#7, #13) (Japanese); Christopher R. Sabat (English) (Note: In the Repeat version, both the Bob Epic Team and Japon Mignon segments are redubbed by the respective episode's main Popuko and Pipimi voice actors.)
- Japon Mignon segments: Fanny Bloc

Pipimi (ピピ美)
The second protagonist and Popuko's friend. A slightly less quick-tempered, tall, blue-haired school girl.

Episode	Japanese voice actor	English voice actor	Notes
1 S1–1	Hōchū Ōtsuka, Noriko Hidaka (original); Kotono Mitsuishi, Norio Wakamoto (Repeat)	Ian Sinclair, Colleen Clinkenbeard	
2 S1–2	Ayana Taketatsu, Shigeru Chiba (original); Azusa Tadokoro, Akira Kamiya (Repeat)	Brina Palencia, Mike McFarland	
3 S1–3	Sumire Uesaka, Norio Wakamoto (original); Asami Imai, Kaito Ishikawa (Repeat)	Jamie Marchi, Kent Williams	Pop Team Epic Kinen
4 S1–4	Satomi Satō, Akira Kamiya (original); Suzuko Mimori, Kōsuke Toriumi (Repeat)	Caitlin Glass, David Wald	
5 S1–5	Yū Kobayashi, Tomokazu Sugita (original); Kaori Nazuka, Yūki Kaji (Repeat)	Monica Rial, J. Michael Tatum	
6 S1–6	Kaori Nazuka, Yūki Kaji (original); Mamiko Noto, Daisuke Namikawa (Repeat)	Luci Christian, Jason Liebrecht	
7 S1–7	Akiko Yajima, Kōsuke Toriumi, Tōru Adachi (AC-bu), Shunsuke Itakura (AC-bu) (Pop Team Story)	Stephanie Young, Chris Rager	
8 S1–8	Azusa Tadokoro, Daisuke Namikawa	Leah Clark, Robert McCollum	
9 S1–9	Asami Imai, Kaito Ishikawa; Yū Kobayashi, Tomokazu Sugita (Repeat)	Kara Edwards, Jerry Jewell	
10; S1–10	Suzuko Mimori, Wataru Takagi	Jessica Calvello, Christopher Bevins	
11; S1–11	Mamiko Noto, Banjō Ginga	Cynthia Cranz, Michael Sinterniklaas	
12; S1–12	Kotono Mitsuishi, Jouji Nakata	Kate Oxley, Matthew Mercer	
13; SP–1	Yui Horie, Akira Ishida (Blue Dragon), Haruka Tomatsu, Kenichi Ogata (White Tiger), Atsuko Tanaka, Kenshō Ono (Vermilion Bird), Nao Tōyama, Jun Fukuyama (Black Tortoise)	Elizabeth Maxwell, Jessie James Grelle	Special
14; SP–2	Kikuko Inoue, Bin Shimada (Blue Dragon), Kaori Fukuhara, Yōsuke Akimoto (White Tiger), Rei Sakuma, Kōji Yusa (Vermilion Bird), Chisa Yokoyama, Takehito Koyasu (Black Tortoise)	Amanda Lee, Patrick Seitz	Special
15; S2–1	Minori Chihara, Ryō Horikawa	Lydia Mackay, Greg Dulcie	
16; S2–2	Rie Kugimiya, Toshiyuki Morikawa	Aaron Roberts	
17; S2–3	Inuko Inuyama, Yuma Uchida	Michele Knotz, Jarrod Greene	
18; S2–4	Mariya Ise, Yū Mizushima	Reagan Murdock	
19; S2–5	Yuki Kaida, Shintarō Asanuma	Megan Shipman	
20; S2–6	Hekiru Shiina, Toshiki Masuda	TBA	
21; S2–7	Tōru Adachi (AC-bu), Koichi Yamadera	Ian Sinclair, Jim Foronda	Team AC special
22; S2–8	Kyoko Hikami, Akio Ōtsuka	Dani Chambers, Alex Organ	
23; S2–9	Yūko Miyamura, Mugihito	Natalie Van Sistine, D.C. Douglas	
24; S2–10	Kumiko Nishihara, Atsushi Abe	Dawn M. Bennett	
25 S2-11	Minako Kotobuki, Hidenari Ugaki	TBA	
26 S2-12	Shuuichi Ikeda	TBA	

- Bob Epic Team segments: Voiced by: Tōru Adachi (AC-bu) (#1 - #6, #8 - #12, #14),
  Tōru Adachi (AC-bu), Shunsuke Itakura (AC-bu) (#7, #13) (Japanese); Ian Sinclair (English)
- Japon Mignon segments: Christine Bellier (TV series), Kaycie Chase (TV special)

== Media ==
=== Manga ===
Pop Team Epic is written and illustrated by Bkub Okawa, previously known for his Touhou Project dōjinshi. The series was serialized in Takeshobo's Manga Life Win website between August 29, 2014 and November 7, 2015. The first tankōbon volume was released in print on December 7, 2015. Okawa released the "second season" on the Manga Life Win website between February 18, 2016, and April 30, 2017. The second volume was released on June 7, 2017. A "third season" began on the Manga Life Win website on October 10, 2017. The manga is licensed in North America by Vertical, who began releasing the series in October 2018. A comic anthology based on the fictional Hoshiiro Girldrop manga featured in the series was released on January 9, 2018.

No.	Title	Original release date	English release date
1	Pop Team Epic ポプテピピック	December 7, 2015; 978-4-8019-5419-9	October 2, 2018; 978-1-94719-419-9
Chapters 1–15
2	Pop Team Epic: Second Season ポプテピピック セカンドシーズン	June 7, 2017; 978-4-8019-5957-6	December 4, 2018; 978-1-94719-425-0
Chapters 1–15
3	Pop Team Epic: Season Three and Four ポプテピピック SEASON THREE AND FOUR	March 7, 2019; 978-4-8019-6549-2	—
Chapters 1–15
4	Pop Team Epic: Season Five ポプテピピック SEASON FIVE	March 5, 2021; 978-4-8019-7228-5	—
Chapters 1–15
5	Pop Team Epic: Season Six ポプテピピック SEASON SIX	December 7, 2021; 978-4-8019-7495-1	—
Chapters 1–15
6	Pop Team Epic: Season Seven ポプテピピック SEASON SEVEN	July 14, 2023; 978-4-8019-8099-0	—
7	Pop Team Epic: Season Eight ポプテピピック SEASON EIGHT	June 17, 2024; 978-4-8019-8329-8	—
8	Pop Team Epic: Season Nine ポプテピピック SEASON NINE	May 15, 2026; 978-4-8019-8972-6	—

No.	Title	Release date	ISBN
—	Hoshiiro Girldrop Comic Anthology ☆色ガールドロップ コミックアンソロジー	January 9, 2018	978-4-8019-6153-1
"Hop Step Drop" (ホップ☆ステップ☆ドロップ, Hoppu Steppu Doroppu) by Kamiya Fujisawa; "Stop! Sosogu-chan" (ストップ!そそぐちゃん, Sutoppu! Sosogu-chan) by Yukiko; "Abe-colored Girl Drop" (阿部色ガールドロップ, Abeiro Gāru Doroppu) by Romancing Abe; "Theory and Hime-chan Punch: The Distance Between Them" (理論とひめちゃんパンチ〜ふたりの距離〜, Riron to Hime-chan Panchi: Futari no Kyori) by Tetsuya Imai; "Huge Shizuku" (でっかいしずく, Dekkai Shizuku) by Fakkuma; "Sosogu is a Quiz Master!?" (そそぐはクイズ王!?, Sosogu wa Kuizu Ō!?) by Sadaji Koike; "Sosogu: The Life of a Star-colored Girl" (星色ガール伝そそぐ, Hoshiiro Gāru-den Sosogu) by Bkub Okawa; "Overflowing" (氾濫, Hanran) by Kafun; "Look, Shizuku" (見ろなのしずく, Miro nano Shizuku) by Heriyama; "Secret Drop Stars" (内緒のドロップスターズ, Naisho no Doroppu Sutāzu) by Auri Hirao; "Embarrassing Maternity Blues" (はにかみ☆マタニティブルー, Hanikami Mataniti Burū) by Riyo; "Final Chapter: Shooting Star" (最終話『流星』, Saishūwa "Ryūsei") by Mizunosoto; "Astromical [sic] Unit" by Popoko Hato
An anthology of comics from different artists about Hoshiiro Girldrop.

=== Anime ===
An anime adaptation of the series was announced on April 2, 2017. It was initially teased as an adaptation of Hoshiiro Girldrop on April Fool's Day 2017. The anime features animation by Kamikaze Douga and production by King Records, and is directed by Jun Aoki and Aoi Umeki. The first season aired on BS11, Tokyo MX and other networks for 12 episodes from January 7 to March 25, 2018, following a delay from October 2017 due to an "error by King Records". A television special aired on April 1, 2019, which consists of episodes 13 and 14.

Taking after its source manga, the anime takes the form of an animated parody show, featuring numerous, typically disjointed skits of varying lengths; while some of these shorts are adapted from the original comic strips, the majority of them are original creations. The various shorts collectively showcase a variety of animation styles, most often CGI, professional-looking 2D animation, and idiosyncratic animation from AC-bu (AC部). (Note: Team AC in the Toonami version; AC Club in the Hidive version.) Each half-hour episode features two near-identical 15-minute segments, each containing different voice actors and other subtle differences.

The opening theme for episodes 2-10 is "Pop Team Epic" (remixed as "Pop Team Epic (Rebroadcasting Mix)" in Pop Team Epic Repeat from the second half of Episode 4 to the first half of Episode 9) by Sumire Uesaka, while the ending theme for the first 9 episodes and episodes 11 and 12 is "Poppy Pappy Day" (remixed in Episode 5 as "Poppy Pappy Day (Route 66 Mix)" and Episode 7 as "Poppy Pappy Day (8 Bit Mix)" (Note: This version of the ending theme is an instrumental 8-bit styled chiptune version.)) is sung by Popuko (Yui Makino/Kenji Akabane (ep 1–6), Hiromi Igarashi/Toshiki Masuda (ep 8–9, 11)) and Pipimi (Yui Watanabe/Shunsuke Takeuchi (ep 1–6), Rei Matsuzaki/Wataru Hatano (ep 8–9, 11)), with Shouta Aoi (Portrayal: Shouta Aoi) performing the theme for the male part of episode 12. The ending theme for episode 10 is "Jinsei" (人生; lit. life) also by the Igarashi/Matsuzaki and Masuda/Hatano duos as Popuko and Pipimi, respectively. The opening theme for Episode 1, which opened with a Hoshiiro Girldrop segment, is the first season's opening theme, "Twinkling Star" by Drop Stars (Sosogu Hoshifuri (Yui Ogura), Shizuku Tsukino (Inori Minase), and Korona Yuhi (Uesaka)). Episode 12 used the classical music pieces Night on Bald Mountain and Dies Irae in its storyline. The opening theme for episode 13 is "last sparkle" by Uesaka, while episode 14 uses the opening theme for the second season of Hoshiiro Girldrop, "Pretty candle star" by Drop Stars (Hiroshifuri (Ogura), Tsukino (Minase), and Yuhi (Uesaka)) in the first half and parodied by AC-bu (Shunsuke Itakura (voicing as Popuko) and Tōru Adachi (voicing as Pipimi)) (voicing as Yuhi) in the second half. The insert song and ending theme for episode 13 are "Popuko ni Sauce" (ポプ子にソース; lit. 'Sauce for Popuko') and "Fūsen Hikō" (風船飛行; lit. 'Balloon Flight'), respectively; both are sung by Popuko (Yuka Ozaki/Kent Ito) and Pipimi (Aya Uchida/Ryuichi Kijima). The insert song for episode 14 is "Bansaku neender", sung by the Ozaki/Uchida and Ito/Kijima duos and the Mendez/Tindle and Lee/Seitz duos as Popuko and Pipimi in both Japanese and English, respectively with Aoi (Portrayal: Aoi) singing his version of the ending theme "Fūsen Hikō" for episode 14a, as well as his own ending theme, "AOI Traveler" for episode 14b.

The series was renewed for a second season on December 26, 2021, following the finale of Pop Team Epic Repeat. Jun Aoki returned as director and scriptwriter, while Space Neko Company is animating the season alongside Kamikaze Douga, and aired from October 2 to December 18, 2022. The opening theme for episodes 16-25 is "Psycho:logy" by Aoi (Portrayal: Aoi) and the ending theme for episodes 15-25 is "Nakayo Peace" (仲良ピース) (Remixed in Episode 2 as "Nakayo Peace (Super Budget Hero★Great Bari Bari Team Epic Mix)" (仲良ピース（超予算勇者★グレートバリバリピピック MIX）), Episode 5 as "Nakayo Peace (B-side Mix)" (仲良ピース（B-side MIX）), Episode 8 as "Nakayo Peace (Katsushika Shusshin Mix)" (仲良ピース（葛飾出身 MIX）), Episode 10 as "Nakayo Peace (Sweet Pop Mix)" (仲良ピース（Sweet Pop MIX）) and Episode 11 as ""Nakayo Peace (Dance Rock Mix) (仲良ピース（Dance Rock MIX）)) by Popuko (Manaka Iwami/Jun Osuka) and Pipimi (Ikumi Hasegawa/Hiroki Takahashi). The opening theme of episodes 15 and 26 is "Endless Love" by Aoi (Portrayal: Aoi), while the ending theme for the episode 26 is "Shota Aoi Gymnastics" by Aoi (Portrayal: Aoi).

Sentai Filmworks simulcast the series on Hidive. Crunchyroll simulcast the series worldwide outside of Asia. Funimation simulcast the English-dubbed version in English-speaking territories as it aired; Funimation also acquired the rights to release the anime on home video in North America. Funimation also arranged the series to air on Adult Swim's Toonami programming block starting on July 1, 2018. In Australia and New Zealand, the series simulcast on AnimeLab. Aniplus Asia simulcast the series in Southeast Asia. The series became available on Netflix in February 2020 in what was originally 11-minute episodes. It was replaced by the original half-hour format due to complaints from users. A remixed rerun titled Pop Team Epic Repeat, which mixes up the voice actors from the original run, began airing from October 9, 2021, and is being simulcast by Crunchyroll. It also features re-recorded versions of the Team AC segments and Japanese dubs of the Japon Mignon segments. There are also visual differences in the Repeat version.

==== Series overview ====
Season	Episodes	Originally released	
Season	Episodes	First released	Last released
1	12	January 7, 2018	March 25, 2018
Specials	2	April 1, 2019	
2	12	October 2, 2022	December 18, 2022

==== Season 1 (2018) ====
No. overall	No. in season	Title	Main segment by	Original release date	English air date	U.S. viewers (millions)
1	1	"Encounter" "Deai" (出会い)	Space Neko Company	January 7, 2018	July 1, 2018 (Note: Adult Swim lists the series as premiering on June 30, 2018 at 12:00 a.m. ET/PT, which is effectively July 1.)	0.21
Hoshiiro Girldrop, a supposed-to-be animated series about a girl who is secretly an idol singer, complete with cold open and title sequence, is quickly abandoned in favor of the antics of Popuko and Pipimi. In the titular segment, Popuko experiences death and rebirth as she experiences many first encounters with Pipimi. Among other skits, Popuko is annoyed by a flight attendant asking whether each passenger will take beef or chicken, Pipimi questions Popuko on any wrongdoings, and the two girls go to France in an attempt to use gestures to communicate.
2	2	"Vanver — A Game in Another Dimension" "Ijigen Yūgi Vanvū" (異次元遊戯ヴァンヴー)	Space Neko Company	January 14, 2018	July 8, 2018	0.17
Popuko and Pipimi are inadvertently summoned to an unfinished animated fantasy series and make the heroes do impressions, much to the voice actors' consternation. Other skits include a stop-motion musical performance by felt dolls of Popuko and Pipimi, Popuko drawing a deluge of fortune slips, and Popuko being confronted with the harsh reality of time's passage.
3	3	"The Documentary" "Za Dokyumento" (ザ・ドキュメント)	Space Neko Company	January 21, 2018	July 15, 2018	0.17
A documentary profiles how music producer PipiP decided to find the perfect bandmates for pop idol Pop-chin by cloning her, with the Pop-chin clones taking over the world. Other skits include Popuko dozing off while leaving for school and severely oversleeping, Popuko becoming obsessed with baguettes, and Pipimi attempting to hire Popuko as an assassin.
4	4	"SWGP2018"	Space Neko Company	January 28, 2018	July 22, 2018	0.18
Popuko takes part in the Skeleton World Grand Prix, facing many tough opponents. Other skits include a parody of Earth, Wind & Fire's "Let's Groove", Popuko forcing an extraterrestrial being to evict from her house, and Popuko and Pipimi encountering a boss while exploring a dungeon.
5	5	"Donca☆Sis" (Note: The English title is a contraction of "Don't call me your sister!". The Japanese title is similarly a contraction of "妹なんて呼ばないで!".) "Imo☆Yoba" (イモ☆ヨバ)	Space Neko Company	February 4, 2018	July 29, 2018	0.17
Iyo Sakuragi becomes step-siblings with her admired upperclassman Hojo after their parents, portrayed by Popuko and Pipimi, get married and make their children's lives a nightmare with their antics. Other skits include a cooking show hosted by Popuko and Pipimi showcasing a simmered dish (煮), Pipimi literally growing with affection for Popuko, Popuko killing herself and Pipimi after choosing to self-destruct rather than die of hiccups, and Popuko doing a poor impression of Mickey Mouse.
6	6	"The 30th Cyber War" / "30th Cyber Warfare"" "Dai Sanjūki Dennō-sen" (第30期 電脳戦)	Space Neko Company	February 11, 2018	August 5, 2018	0.15
Guided by the spirit of Pipimi, Popuko fights against the Elite Four in a shogi tournament. Other skits include Pipimi's fantasies about Hellshake Yano distracting her from Popuko's venting, Popuko demonstrating an increasingly bizarre variety of regional activities, Popuko and Pipimi discussing modern slang, and Popuko thanking those supporting her fanbase while making death threats on the rest.
7	7	"Hellshake Yano" "Herusheiku Yano" (ヘルシェイク矢野)	AC-bu	February 18, 2018	August 12, 2018	0.19
Pipimi daydreams of when rock star Hellshake Yano held a concert by himself while his bandmates were running late, told through a kamishibai performance by AC-bu (Shunsuke Itakura and Tōru Adachi (EN Voice: Christopher R. Sabat & Ian Sinclair)). Other skits include dealing with haters, Popuko turning into a baby, and Pipimi going fishing.
8	8	"The Dragon of Iidabashi ~Pipi's Revenge~" / "The Rising Dragon of Iidabashi ~Pipi the Avenger~" "Īdabashi no Shōryū ~Fukushū no Pipi~" (飯田橋の昇竜 ～復讐のピピ～)	Space Neko Company	February 25, 2018	August 19, 2018	0.14
Yakuza member Pipi decides to take vengeance against her gang when they stray down the wrong path of committing YouTuber crimes. Other skits include Popuko trying to treat an injury, bacon trying to eat some bacon, and Popuko fools a dead tree by throwing some flour (instead of magic powder) against the tree.
9	9	"Dancing with a Miracle" / "Dancing with Miracles" "Kiseki to Dansu o" (奇跡とダンスを)	Space Neko Company	March 4, 2018	August 26, 2018	0.16
Popuko and Pipimi encounter a young runaway boy while visiting New York City and made a lasting impression on him that shaped his ideals. Other skits include Popuko ordering latte art, Pipimi attempting standup comedy, and the girls trying French cuisine.
10	10	"Ginza Hostess Detective" "Ginza Hosutesu Tantei" (銀座ホステス探偵)	Space Neko Company	March 11, 2018	September 9, 2018	0.16
While staying at a hot spring inn, hostesses Popuko and Pipimi investigate a murder that has taken place. Other skits include the girls playing soccer, Pipimi cooking some premium meat, and Popuko dealing with incompetent waiters.
11	11	"Cursed Mansion" "Jukan" (呪館 JUKAN)	Space Neko Company	March 18, 2018	September 16, 2018	0.16
A group of college students find the mansion they are staying in to be haunted by Popuko and Pipimi, who do nothing as the students end up killing each other. Other skits include Popuko starting a dance craze called Eisai Haramasukoi, Pipimi becoming giant, and Popuko playing with a shark.
12	12	"The Age of Pop Team Epic"	Space Neko Company	March 25, 2018	September 23, 2018	0.17
Popuko and Pipimi have a final showdown against the evil King Records organization after they sent a death squad on them, with guest appearance by time traveler Shouta Aoi (Portrayal: Shouta Aoi / EN Voice: Apphia Yu). Other skits include a talking hamster going to school by hiding in his master's bag, Popuko trying to find her glasses, and the Popuko and Pipimi felt dolls singing about growing up and destruction. After the credits in the second half, there is a preview of the first episode of the second season of Hoshiiro Girldrop. The opening part is a parody of Ecole Software's Death Crimson for the Sega Saturn, which is exclusive to Japan. HALO produced the ending part in the second half.

==== Specials (2019) ====
Both episodes for the main segments are by Space Neko Company.

No. overall	No. in season	Title	Opening animation by	Original release date
13	1	"The Convenience Store" "Konbini" (コンビニ)	Sunrise (Note: Credited as "????" in the eyecatches, as well as the title card in Season 2 Episode 2.)	April 1, 2019
Popuko and Pipimi discuss potential careers in the future, playing out a scene where Popuko plays a convenience store clerk being hassled by both Pipimi and Cthulhu, before it degenerates into a certain film. Other skits include Popuko allured by a food truck, a clay-mation of Pipimi playing Daruma Otoshi, and Pipimi telling Popuko what 1+1 is. The post-credit scene is the chapter 1 opening scene of Square Enix's Final Fantasy XV, called "Departure", only with Popuko masks on Noctis, Gladious, and Prompto, and a Pipimi mask on Ignis. Masami Obari supervises the prologue skit and opening animation.
14	2	"Edo Era Pop Team" "Ōedo Popute" (大江戸ポプテ)	Asura Film; AC-bu (parody in the second half)	April 1, 2019
In Japan during its Edo Era, Pipimi is giving Popuko combat training when they accidentally kill a mountain deity, forcing them to battle a demon the deity kept at bay in a biker bar with a return appearance by Shouta Aoi (Portrayal: Shouta Aoi / EN Voice: Apphia Yu). Other skits include a song about how stupid the anime series is and how they ran out of voice actors to play the lead characters, using the power of imagination to get revenge on your boss, and Pipimi bringing a flower back to life.

==== Season 2 (2022) ====
No. overall	No. in season	Title	Main segment by	Original release date
15	1	"Identity" "Aidentiti" (アイデンティティ)	Space Neko Company	October 2, 2022
Continuing from the previous episode, Shouta Aoi (Portrayal: Shouta Aoi / EN Voice: Apphia Yu) is featured in a Kamen Rider parody as the show's opening, entitled "Endless Love", with HALO producing the opening part. In the main segment, Popuko and Pipimi talk about having a unique identity through a dance sequence. They have a press conference addressing their audience. They stand out in the street to see if anyone recognizes them. Some other skits include "Pop Team Epic: B-side", retelling their first skit through a parody of the yaoi genre, and the girls are attacked by a Chocobo in the forest in the first special collaboration segment with Square Enix.
16	2	"Here We Go! Biggus McHugeGuy Combination" "Deta! Chō Kuso Deka Gattai" (出た！超クソデカ合体)	Sunrise	October 9, 2022
The girls use their "Obari" power in a climactic battle against "King Recorder" in the final episode of "Super Budget Hero★Great Bari Bari Team Epic" (超予算勇者★グレートバリバリピピック, Chō Yosan Yūsha★Gurētobaribaripipikku). Other skits include Popuko accidentally shaving a client's dog naked, Popuko asking for headpats from Pipimi and Popuko responding to a debate challenge with a nail bat. This episode features the special collaboration segment with Earth Corporation. Masami Obari supervises the main segment and ending animation.
17	3	"Poputan" "Popputo~uan" (ポップトゥアン)	Space Neko Company	October 16, 2022
Spoofing Dora the Explorer, Poputan and Pipitan host an educational program. Other skits include Popuko accidentally drinking plain boiling water from Pipimi, Pipimi thinking Popuko's robot goes over budget, Nanachi (from Made in Abyss) guest-starring on a ranking show, the girls doing a "kid-friendly torture" show in the park, Popuko doing a rap and the girls being chocobos in the second special collaboration segment with Square Enix. The ending segments are live-action sequences of Popuko and Pipimi at the King Records (first half) and Takeshobo (second half) buildings.
18	4	"Train Battle" "Toreinbatoru" (トレインバトル)	Flat Studio	October 23, 2022
The girls play jankenpon against each other. Popuko gets on a bullet train to Kyoto, and enters a Train Battle with Pipimi. Popuko wins a competition. Popuko throws away random junk. Pipimi defends Popuko from a rude teacher. Pipimi tests Popuko's eyesight. The girls fight each other for clout. The girls write Senryū. Pipimi is the detective in an old adventure game. The girls battle each other with "dumbass personalities". This episode features a third special collaboration segment with Square Enix.
19	5	"Shining Shoulder"	Space Neko Company	October 30, 2022
The girls are evil bandits. Pipimi teaches English. The girls demonstrate the Backpow Workout. Pipimi considers pulling out Popuko's chair. Popuko's mind and body are out of balance. Pop Team Cooking shows off paella at an audience full of kids. The girls are talking trains. Popuko is carsick. Pipimi cuts Popuko's hair. A cactus and a sharp comb offer free hugs. Popuko talks about urban legends. Popuu terrorizes scarecrows in a 3D video game. The "Pop Team Epic: B-side" segment is cancelled, as Popuko destroys the Takeshobo building in response. This episode features the fourth special collaboration segment with Square Enix.
20	6	"POP Memories to YOU"	Space Neko Company	November 6, 2022
Popuko interviews the Earth. The girls are multiple characters in a romantic Visual Novel. Popuko is auto-tracking Pipimi. Pipimi does the same. A man makes fried rice. An ad for Kappa Sushi. Popuko tries to watch a horror movie. Pipimi has brown sugar. The ending animation is a parody of The First Take as Popuko does a live session. This episode features the special collaboration segment with Kappa Sushi.
21	7	"Raising Hell: The Hellshake Arrow" "Raijingu・Heru 〜Herusheiku no Ya〜" (ライジング・ヘル 〜ヘルシェイクの矢〜)	AC-bu	November 13, 2022
Pipimi daydreams about Hellshake Yano, who is trying to regain his fame through a 30-second talent show on television and must gain the power of the Master Pick to do so. The story is told by AC-bu (Shunsuke Itakura and Tōru Adachi (first half only) (JP Voice: Koichi Yamadera / EN Voice: Jim Foronda (second half only)) through a kamishibai and includes a special collaboration segment with Apollon.
22	8	"Pop Team Epic Battle Royale" "Poputepipikku Batoru Rowaiyaru" (ポプテピピックバトルロワイヤル)	Space Neko Company	November 20, 2022
The girls play shiritori. The girls play in a battle royale game. Pipimi has her legs crossed. Pipimi does the donchiki. Pipimi takes glamour shots. Pipimi uses whipped cream in Pop Team Cooking. Popuko turns into a harp. The girls say what they want to be. Popuko wants to listen to ASMR. Popuko has a charged Ultimate. Playing with vegetables. Popuko delivers a package. Pipimi reminisces about old videogames. Popuko gives Pipimi a jack-in-the-box.
23	9	"Bump-Boo Crusaders"	Contrail	November 27, 2022
Popuko kills a man. A parody of an old bancho anime with Cthulhu acting as a main character. An old Brazilian-themed amusement park ad in a special collaboration segment with Brazilian Park Washuzan Highland. Pipimi tells Popuko what she likes about her. Popuko did not do her homework. A UFO makes a crop circle. Popuko reviews a floor. Popuko tries to catch a race car. This episode also features the fifth special collaboration segment with Square Enix.
24	10	"The Kingdom of Nature" "Shizen no Ōkoku" (自然の王国)	Space Neko Company	December 4, 2022
Pipimi baked a cake. Popuko shakes an otter's hand. Popuko is on trial. Popuko is on drugs. A documentary about reintroducing predators into a nature reserve is used in a game show. A young man reminisces about the "Picolino Cannon". Pipimi refills Popuko's coffee. The girls enter the land of Eorzea (from Final Fantasy XIV) in the sixth and final special collaboration segment with Square Enix. The girls start a chain conversation. The girls win a match of "Poppex Legends", a parody of Apex Legends.
25	11	"Boomer Team Epic" "Jukunen Konbipipikku" (熟年コンビピピック)	Studio Crocodile	December 11, 2022
Furry friends talk to each other. Popular comedians share a greenroom and reminisce about the past. Pipimi tickles Popuko. Popuko wants a shiitake mushroom log. Popuko talks to a torpedo. The girls interrogate a policeman. Popuko is a pro gamer. The girls play "Look That Way." Popuko tries to fix Pipimi with a Free Transform tool. The ending animation is done by Kéké.
26	12	"Endless Love"	HALO (live-action); Space Neko Company & Kamikaze Douga (animation)	December 18, 2022
Shouta Aoi (Portrayal: Shouta Aoi / EN Voice: Apphia Yu) fights to defend the multiverse from General Nishikawa (Portrayal: Takanori Nishikawa), who seeks to destroy all timelines that are not his own. He is assisted by Yuichi Nakamura (Portrayal: Yuichi Nakamura), the former commander of the Time Patrol squad, as well as another Nakamura from a different timeline, who is the leader of the Resistance (Portrayal: Nakamura / JP Voice: Yuichi Nakamura). Shouta Aoi defeats Nishikawa with the help of all versions of Popuko and Pipimi from the previous episodes. The episode includes an intermission for a weather report for the Kanto region and an ad for Poptepip Candy.

== Marketing ==
The Nendoroid figures of Popuko and Pipimi, dressed as Batman Ninja's Batman (voiced by Kōichi Yamadera) and Joker (voiced by Wataru Takagi) respectively, were displayed at the Warner Bros. booth at AnimeJapan 2018. It was suggested by Junpei Mizusaki at Kamikaze Douga; the studio animated both Pop Team Epic television series and Batman Ninja film. The crossover figures were accompanied by a 15-second television commercial, where Popuko and Pipimi (in the aforementioned costumes and being voiced by the film's respective voice actors) re-enact a sketch from Pop Team Epic comics before it jumps to a Batman Ninja scene.

On April 26, 2018, Japan Racing Association's Umabi.jp website launched the Pop Team Epic Kinen (ポプテピ記念, Poputepi Kinen) campaign, where users can create a customised avatar of either Popuko or Pipimi as a virtual spectator. It also hinted a surprise to be revealed when a number of avatars reaches one million. As the number reached one million in late May 2018, the JRA released a branded webisode on 14 June 2018. Produced by Space Neko Company (which animated Pop Team Story segments and some of short sketches in the TV series), Mikako Komatsu and Ryusei Nakao reprised their role as Popuko in the first and second halves respectively, and so did Sumire Uesaka and Norio Wakamoto as Pipimi. The JRA also held promotional events at Tokyo Racecourse.
