= Sand Land =

Japanese manga series by Akira Toriyama

- Cover of the tankōbon volume, featuring Beelzebub, Rao, and Thief
- Genre: Adventure; Science fiction comedy
- Manga
- Written by: Akira Toriyama
- Published by: Shueisha
- English publisher: NA: Viz Media
- Imprint: Jump Comics
- Magazine: Weekly Shōnen Jump
- English magazine: NA: Shonen Jump
- Original run: May 9, 2000 – August 8, 2000
- Volumes: 1
- Anime film
- Directed by: Toshihisa Yokoshima (Note: With Hiroshi Kōjina acting as the Direction Advisor (ディレクションアドバイザー).)
- Written by: Hayashi Mori
- Music by: Yugo Kanno
- Studio: Sunrise; Kamikaze Douga; Anima
- Released: August 18, 2023
- Runtime: 106 minutes
- Original net animation

Sand Land: The Series
- Directed by: Toshihisa Yokoshima
- Written by: Hayashi Mori
- Music by: Yugo Kanno
- Studio: Sunrise; Kamikaze Douga; Anima
- Licensed by: Disney Platform Distribution
- Released: March 20, 2024 – May 1, 2024
- Episodes: 13
- Related media
- Sand Land (video game)
- icon

Sand Land (stylized in all caps) is a Japanese manga series written and illustrated by Akira Toriyama. It was serialized in Shueisha's shōnen manga magazine Weekly Shōnen Jump from May to August 2000, and was collected into a single tankōbon volume in November of that same year. Sand Land was first serialized in North America by Viz Media in their English Shonen Jump magazine in 2003, then later released in one graphic novel in December of that same year.

A CGI anime film adaptation co-produced by Sunrise, Kamikaze Douga, and Anima was released in August 2023, while an original net animation (ONA) series was released worldwide on Disney+ and Hulu from March to May 2024. An action role-playing video game adaptation, also titled Sand Land, was released in April 2024.

== Plot ==
After enduring years of natural disaster and war, the world is left without its main supply of water; the river that provided water to the country dried up long ago. With the greedy king of the land's personal water supply becoming increasingly more expensive for the citizens of Sand Land to buy, the people begin robbing one another for water and money. Sheriff Rao, tired of the king's greed, approaches the demons of Sand Land for help in searching for a new water supply. Demon prince Beelzebub and his friend Thief agree to join Rao.

Soon after their quest begins, their car breaks down and they are forced to steal a tank from the king's army. This attracts the anger of the king and he mobilizes his forces to stop them. Sheriff Rao, a former legendary general of the king's army, is able to quickly deal with all of the current army's attempts to hinder their progress. Once they reach the supposed water supply at the end of the now dried up river bed, they find a lake that now acts as the king's private reserves. With the water sealed away behind a dam to give the king a monopoly over water, Rao, the demons, and those sympathetic to their cause tear it down. With the water returned to the world as a result, the king's oppressive rule is brought to an end.

== Characters ==
Beelzebub (ベルゼブブ, Beruzebubu)
Voiced by: Mutsumi Tamura (Japanese); Risa Mei (English)
Beelzebub, named after the biblical demon of the same name, is the son of Lucifer and the prince of demons. Generally referred to only as "Prince" by his fellow demons and nicknamed "Beelz" by Rao, Beelzebub tries to live in relative harmony with the humans. Although he regularly steals water from them, he only takes as much as he and the demons need to survive. Simply joining Sheriff Rao out of boredom, Beelzebub lends his enhanced sight and demonic strength to fight against the tyrannous king. By basking in moonlight, Beelzebub can absorb the "power of darkness," which he can unleash to temporarily boost his strength and demonic powers.
Rao (ラオ)
Voiced by: Kazuhiro Yamaji (Japanese); John Lipow (English)
An elderly man and sheriff of a small village, Rao seeks to free the people of Sand Land from the king's pocket. Formerly known as General Shiba (シバ将軍, Shiba Shōgun), he is in truth a legendary tank commander believed to have died 30 years ago along with his forces while destroying a mysterious weapon produced by the Picchi on the King's orders. Rao learns from Beelzebub and Thief that it was not a weapon, but a machine to produce water. This information prompts Rao to right his wrong by bringing down the king and help those whose families died due to his actions. He is a skilled tonfa fighter.
Thief (シーフ, Shīfu)
Voiced by: Chō (Japanese); Owen Thomas (English)
Thief is reluctantly recruited by Beelzebub for his expertise at stealing and his great wisdom. He often fights with Beelzebub for turns to drive the tank and frequently complains about the constant danger the group faces. He dresses in a Santa Claus costume when thieving. Despite looking and acting like an old man, Thief claims he is not that much older than Beelzebub.
General Are (アレ将軍, Are Shōgun)
Voiced by: Satoshi Tsuruoka (Japanese); Andrew Lander (English)
Rao's replacement in the king's army, Are's father died during the raid against the mysterious weapon. Initially, he actively pursues Rao in order to avenge his father. However, once he learns the truth about the mysterious weapon, he joins Rao in bringing down the king. His tank is unique compared to others in the tank brigade, as it is equipped with a more powerful artillery cannon.
General Zeu (ゼウ大将軍, Zeu Daishōgun)
Voiced by: Nobuo Tobita (Japanese); Shawn Smith (English)
The true antagonist of Sand Land, Zeu is the aging commander of the king's forces. Due to his failing body, Zeu is confined to a floating robotic lift. He ordered the attack on the Picchi people, the creators of the water-producing machine, to both rid himself of Shiba's disobedient tank brigade and the threat to the king's monopoly. He uses the king as a figurehead to rule Sand Land. Ultimately, Are shoots and kills him with a tank cannon blast.
King (国王, Kokuō)
Voiced by: Chafurin (Japanese); Alan Adelberg (English)
As the current ruler of Sand Land, the king makes enormous profit by selling bottled water at high prices. He tries to eliminate Rao to make sure nobody finds out about his personal water supply or the water-creating machine he had destroyed. After water is returned to Sand Land, he is forced by Rao to give his wealth to the people. A cowardly hedonist, the king cares only about maintaining his power and profits and is quick to abandon his people when Sand Land is threatened by the flying fortress Garam.
Lucifer (サタン, Satan; lit. "Satan")
Voiced by: Akio Otsuka (Japanese); Keith Silverstein (English)
King of the demons and Beelzebub's father. Cold and strict, he does not concern himself with the affairs of humans and possesses immense power. Despite his attitude, he cares for his people and agrees to let Beelzebub journey with Rao because of the potential benefit to demonkind.
Papa (パパ)
Voiced by: Tomokazu Sugita (Japanese); Erik Braa (English)
The muscular leader of the Swimmers (スイマーズ, Suimāzu), the self-proclaimed "greatest criminals in Sand Land", and father of the other members.
Pike (パイク, Paiku)
Voiced by: Kōji Yusa (Japanese); Pranshu Mishra (English)
A skinny member of the Swimmers who wears a necktie with no shirt and a cooking pot as a helmet. He has superhuman eyesight and can draw incredibly detailed and accurate sketches from memory.
Shark (シャーク, Shāku)
Voiced by: Hiroyuki Yoshino (Japanese); Rick Zieff (English)
A skinny member of the Swimmers who wears a blazer with no shirt and a wide-brimmed hat. He can run at superhuman speed.
Guppy (グッピー, Guppī)
Voiced by: Masafumi Kobatake (Japanese); Bobby Foley (English)
An extremely large and fat member of the Swimmers. He carries a large hand cannon.
Ann (アン, An)
Voiced by: Mikako Komatsu (Japanese); Kira Buckland (English)
A character from Sand Land: The Series and the Sand Land video game. She is a mechanically-savvy girl from Forest Land who recruits Beelzebub and company to help save Forest Land from Muniel and Bred. She is later revealed to be Forest Land's princess and a half-demon as her mother, Queen Lilith, is Beelzebub's older sister, making Beelzebub her uncle.
Muniel (ムニエル, Munieru)
Voiced by: Ayumu Murase (Japanese); Seth Fuentes (English)
A character from Sand Land: The Series and the Sand Land video game. He is the main antagonist of the game and the second half of the series. He is an angel who proclaims to be the hero of Forest Land. Originally a low-ranked archive clerk, Muniel steals a staff that creates lightning clouds and a demon-sealing urn and descends to the mortal realm without permission, intending to purge the world of demons. His hatred of demons is intensified when he confronts Lucifer, who effortlessly tears off his wings and flicks him into Forest Land.
Bred (ブレッド, Bureddo)
Voiced by: Tesshō Genda (Japanese); Mike Smith (English)
A character from Sand Land: The Series and the Sand Land video game. He is a general for Forest Land who serves Muniel despite skepticism of his actions.
Lilith (リリス, Ririsu)
Voiced by: Yūko Kaida (Japanese); Sasha Sloan (English)
A character from Sand Land: The Series and the Sand Land video game. The Queen of Forest Land and Ann's mother. Lilith is Lucifer's eldest daughter and Beelzebub's older sister. She has the same demonic powers as her father and brother and usually disguises herself as a human.

== Production ==
Following the conclusion of Dragon Ball in 1995, Akira Toriyama created short stories and one-offs. However, he decided to write one more work that would be his last, and in which he would put everything he had. He intended for Sand Land to be a short story about an old man and a tank that he wrote for his own enjoyment. However, he had difficulty drawing the tank and, as he insisted on drawing everything himself, soon regretted it. Although he became frustrated, Toriyama had already devised the plot to involve the tank and thus grudgingly went through with it.

While he personally preferred lighthearted content, he was aware most readers did not, and therefore tried his best to tone down the light parts and make it a serious story. However, Toriyama said he ultimately ended up prioritizing his personal preferences and should have thought about the readers more. He inked the manuscripts on paper before scanning them into a computer and using software to paint in solid colors and apply tones.

After drawing the pages for Sand Land, he lost the pen holder that he had used since before his debut. Toriyama later quipped that this was the reason he hardly drew any more manga. Looking back on the series 23 years later, he found that his drawing ability and energy were incredible at the time it was made.

== Media ==
=== Manga ===
Written and illustrated by Akira Toriyama, Sand Land was serialized in Shueisha's shōnen manga magazine Weekly Shōnen Jump from May 9 to August 8, 2000. (Note: It started in the magazine's 23nd issue of 2000 (cover date May 22), released on May 9 of that same year.) (Note: It finished in the magazine's combined 36th–37th issue (cover date August 21), released on August 8 of that same year.) Its 14 chapters were collected into a single tankōbon volume that was released on November 2, 2000. A kanzenban edition was published on August 4, 2023. That same day, a "full color" version of the manga began serialization in Shueisha's monthly Saikyō Jump magazine. It ended in the October 2024 issue on September 4, 2024.

In 2003, Viz Media licensed Sand Land for English release in North America. It was first serialized in their manga anthology magazine Shonen Jump for eleven issues, from the January to the November 2003 issues. The collected graphic novel was released later in paperback on December 24, 2003, and digitally as an ebook on June 4, 2013.

==== Chapters ====
No.	Original release date	Original ISBN	English release date	English ISBN
01	November 2, 2000 (tankōbon); August 4, 2023 (kanzenban)	4-08-873039-9 (tankōbon); 978-4-08-792607-1 (kanzenban)	December 24, 2003 (print); June 4, 2013 (digital)	978-1-59116-181-3 (print); 978-1-4215-6503-3 (digital)
Chapter 01: "Let's Go!" (出発, Shuppatsu); Chapter 02: "The Gang of Thieves" (盗賊団, Dōzokudan); Chapter 03: "The Tank" (戦車, Sensha); Chapter 04: "The Flying Tank" (飛行タンク, Hikō no Tanku); Chapter 05: "Night Truths" (闇の真相, Yami no Shinzō); Chapter 06: "Rao's Lucky Charm" (ラオのお守り, Rao no Omamori); Chapter 07: "Tank Battle" (戦車戦, Sensha Sen); Chapter 08: "General vs. General" (シバ将軍とアレ将軍, Shiba Shōgun to Are Shōgun); Chapter 09: "The Thing in the Sandstorm" (砂嵐のみつけたもの, Sunarashi no Mitsuketa Mono); Chapter 10: "The Phantom Lake" (幻の泉, Maboroshi no Izumi); Chapter 11: "The Secret of the Reservoir" (水源の秘密, Suigen no Himitsu); Chapter 12: "The Demon Beelzebub" (悪魔のベルゼブブ, Akuma no Beruzebubu); Chapter 13: "The End of the Path" (決戦の行方, Kessen no Yukue); Chapter 14: "The River" (川, Kawa)

=== Anime ===
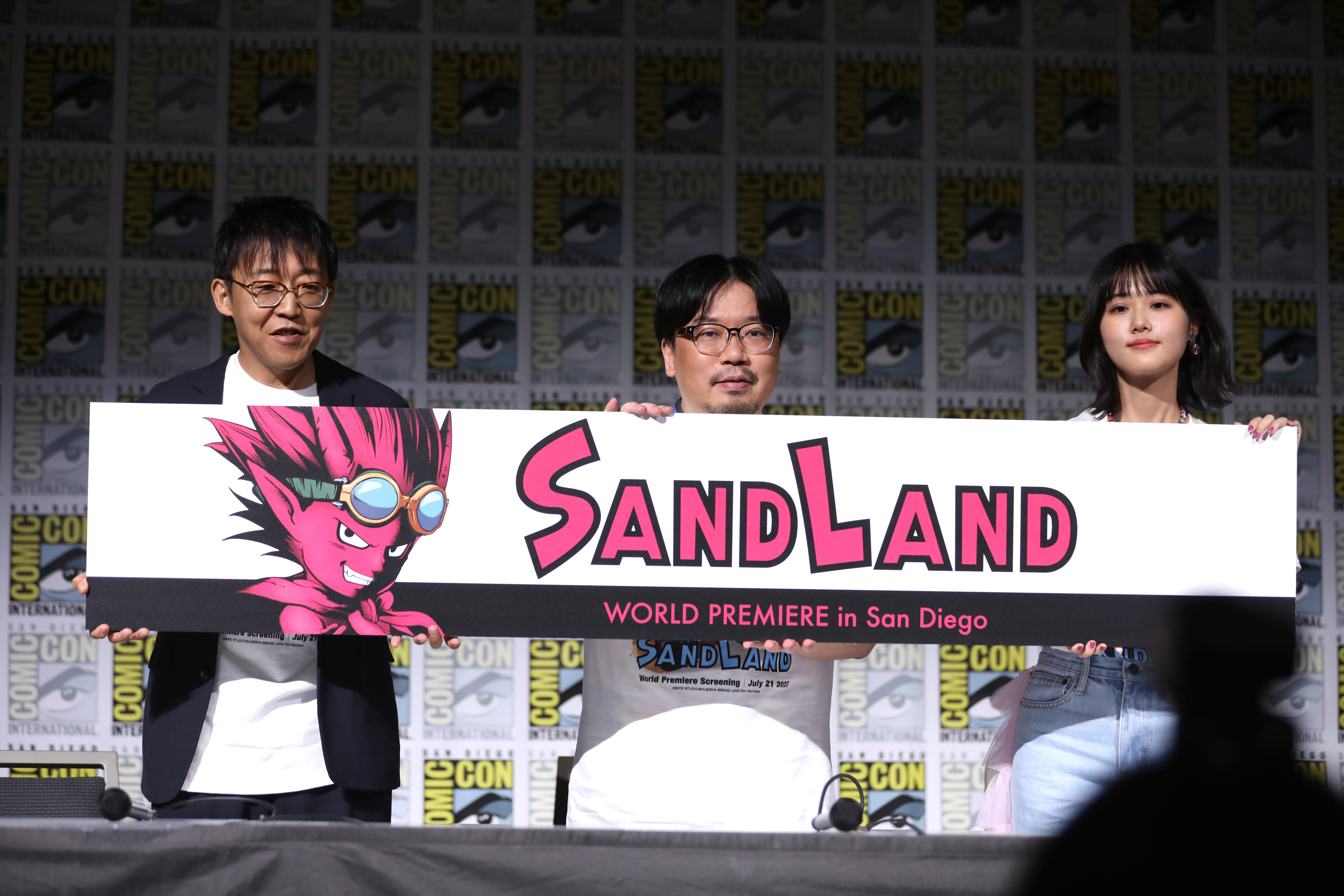
Akio Iyoku, Toshihisa Yokoshima, and Nanoka Hara at San Diego Comic-Con 2023

On December 8, 2022, Bandai Namco opened a website for "Sand Land Project" and uploaded a teaser video featuring Toriyama's art from the manga. The website featured a countdown that ended on December 17. On that date, it was announced that the series would receive a CGI anime film adaptation co-produced by Sunrise, Kamikaze Douga, and Anima. The film was directed by Toshihisa Yokoshima, with Hiroshi Kōjina serving as directing advisor, Hayashi Mori writing the screenplay, Yoshikazu Iwanami directing the sound, and Yugo Kanno composing the music. Imase performed the film's theme song "Utopia" (ユートピア). The film had its world premiere screening at San Diego Comic-Con on July 22, 2023. It was then officially released in Japanese theaters on August 18 of the same year by Toho, with a North American release following in 2024. The film was released on DVD and Blu-ray in Japan on May 29, 2024, with English subtitles.

An original net animation (ONA) series was announced on November 14, 2023. The cast and staff members from the film reprised their roles. The opening theme is "Water Carrier" by Kroi, while the ending theme is "Drive My Idea" (ドライブ・マイ・イデア) by Tempalay. The first seven episodes of the series began streaming worldwide on Disney+ and in the United States on Hulu on March 20, 2024. The remaining episodes were released once a week. The first six episodes comprise "The Story of the Fiend Prince" (悪魔の王子, Akuma no Ōji) arc and retell the story of the film with some new scenes, while the final seven episodes comprise "The Story of the Angel Hero" (天使の勇者, Tenshi no Yūsha) arc, which Toriyama newly wrote for the ONA. Toriyama also named the two arcs and designed the new characters such as Ann and Muniel. However, he died before the ONA premiered on March 1, 2024.

A televised broadcast of the series ran in Japan on NHK General TV from June 28 to September 27, 2025.

==== Episodes ====
No.	Title (Note: All English titles are taken from Hulu.)	Directed by (Note: Information is taken from the ending credits of each episode.)	Original release date
1	"Departure"; Transliteration: "Akuma to Ningen no Tabidachi" (Japanese: 悪魔と人間の旅立ち)	Toshihisa Yokoshima; Wakiko Kume	March 20, 2024
Two soldiers transporting water at night are attacked by demons led by Beelzebub, who deliver some bottles to a remote town where their wells have dried up and they return with the rest to Demon Village. After seeing a rare water finch, Sheriff Rao from the town visits the Demon Village to ask for the help of a demon to find the Legendary Spring. Lucifer grants permission for Beelzebub to accompany him and he takes Thief as well. On the way, they are attacked and chased by a Geji Dragon and escape but lose all their supplies. As they head for a nearby town, their tires are punctured by a group of bandits and Rao is knocked out.
2	"The Royal Army's Secret"; Transliteration: "Kokuōgun no Himitsu" (Japanese: 国王軍の秘密)	Wakiko Kume	March 20, 2024
Beelzebub easily defeats the group of bandits, but their vehicle is damaged so he, Rao and Thief have to walk through the desert. When they head near a trading hub, Thief goes on ahead to acquire supplies and a vehicle. He finds a Royal Army sand tank and tricks the crew into abandoning it. After taking control of tank 104, the trio drive south along the dry river bed where they are eventually seen by General Are from an armed flying device carrying a huge spherical tank of water. When Rao punctures the water tank, Are drops it and pursues them, dropping bombs from the air. Beelzebub and Thief then lift the front of the tank and Rao fires a shell, bringing down Are's ship. On the radio, they hear communications about the incident and Rao learns that General Zeu is still alive and that the source of the King's water is further south.
3	"A Man Called Legend"; Transliteration: "Densetsu to Yoba Reta Otoko" (Japanese: 伝説と呼ばれた男)	Kōji Sasaki	March 20, 2024
In an attempt to turn the citizens against Rao, Beelzebub and Thief, the King broadcasts a message that a group in a tank are stealing water and he offers a reward for their capture. When General Zeu discovers that the stolen tank driver is the former General Shiva, he send General Are's four-tank squad to destroy him. However, Rao positions tank 104 to have the sun behind him, blinding two army tank drivers so that Rao quickly disables of their tanks, halving General Are's forces.
4	"Beyond the Sandstorm"; Transliteration: "Sunaarashi no Mukō ni" (Japanese: 砂嵐の向こうに)	Masatoshi Hakata	March 20, 2024
General Are's remaining two tanks chase tank 104 between rock formations. During the chase, Rao realizes that Beelzebub can communicate with him telepathically, so with Beelzebub as spotter, they disable one tank and bring Are's tank to a standstill. General Are asks Rao about his motives and the "great explosion". Rao explains that he is seeking the Legendary Spring and that as General Shiva he was duped by the General Supreme Commander Zeu into destroying the Picchi people who were accused of developing a weapon, which was in fact a water-making machine. Meanwhile, the Swimmers have been watching the skirmish and plan to destroy the whole group to claim the reward. However, they are foiled by Beelzebub who neurtalizes them. Beelzebub then gets caught in a sandstorm. While seeking shelter, he stumbles upon the Legendary Spring. Skeptical of Rao's story, Are contacts the king and tricks him into confirming Rao's statement about the Picchi.
5	"The Terrifying Insect Men"; Transliteration: "Kyōfu no Mushi Ningen" (Japanese: 恐怖の虫人間)	Ayumu Ono; Kōji Sasaki	March 20, 2024
Beelzebub leads Rao and Thief to the Legendary Spring, which they realize the King has kept a secret. Beelzebub detects someone nearby and comes across a group of frightened Picchi and their offspring who survived the "great explosion". General Zeu recalls Are, but before he leaves, Are radio the troops guarding the army's water supply to stand down and his message also informs Rao's group of the location of the water. Rao turns his tank towards the location of the water supply, and they discover a heavily fortified dam the King built to control the country's water. However, Zeu has Dr. Pose deploy a squad of fierce and strong Insect Men who attack the tank of Rao, Beelzebub, and Thief.
6	"The Fiend Beelzebub"; Transliteration: "Akuma no Beruzebubu" (Japanese: 悪魔のベルゼブブ)	Ayumu Ono; Kōji Sasaki	March 20, 2024
The Insect Men overwhelm and savagely attack Beelzebub. However, his demon body enables him to recover and he defeats them all. In desperation, Zeu detonates a bomb within an Insect Man's body, causing a massive explosion that destroys everything within the vicinity. Meanwhile, Thief convinces Rao to turn their attention to defeating Zeu and they get aboard his anti-gravitation battleship. Rao confronts Zeu, but he has trouble against Zeu's floating robotic device until Are arrives and fires a tank shell into it. Zeu makes one last effort to destroy Rao, but Beelzebub sends him flying into the distance. The combined shelling of the tanks and a shell from Swimmer Guppy's cannon breaches the dam wall, releasing the water back into Sand Land. Are later takes on the position of General Supreme Commander.
7	"On to a New Adventure"; Transliteration: "Iza! Aratana Bōken e" (Japanese: いざ!新たな冒険へ)	Hiroshi Kōjina	March 20, 2024
Rao invites Beelzebub and Thief to accompany him to take supplies to the Picchi. When they stop in a small town, they encounters an angel searching for an ancient magical urn. The angel declares himself a hero and attacks Beelzebub, who beats him off because the angel cannot generate lightning in the dry desert air. In return for their gifts, the Picchi give Rao a "stun gun" and Beelzebub a "floaty tablet" dispenser. Later, they see a girl being pursued by drones who take her capsule containing Aquanium. The trio then take her with them at the edge of an area called Doomlands, which Rao realizes he created 30 years earlier with an Aquanium explosion after being ordered to destroy the Picchi. The girl, whose name is Ann, explains that she is a member of the Resistance trying to stop the Forest Land Army led by General Bred and Muniel, the self-named hero who seized power 10 years ago. The trio agree to help her and she leads them through a long tunnel into the lush green Forest Land.
8	"Operation: Sneak Into the Capital!"; Transliteration: "Sen'nyū Dai Sakusen!" (Japanese: 潜入大作戦!)	Nozomu Kamiya	March 27, 2024
Ann takes the trio to meet members of the Resistance who report that King Jam is to executed the next day. She later reveals that she is the king's daughter. They split into two teams, with Ann and Beelzebub going to save the king while Rao and Thief plan to retrieve the Aquanium. Ann and Beelzebub dress as locals, while Thief steals military uniforms so he and Rao can infiltrate the palace. In the public square, Muniel berates the king while emphasizing his role as the country's hero and stirs up the crowd's animosity towards the king. When King Jam is brought out, Beelzebub sneaks behind the stage to rescue him. However, he is met by Muniel who can now generate powerful lightning bolts because of the humid atmosphere in Forest Land.
9	"Fiend Power"; Transliteration: "Akuma no Chikara" (Japanese: 悪魔の力)	Masatoshi Hakata	April 3, 2024
As Rao and Thief try to leave with the Aquanium, they are confronted by the huge General Bred but they manage to escape when Bred punches a huge hole in the wall. Outside, Muniel strikes down Beelzebub with a massive lightning bolt and whips the crowd into a frenzy alleging that the king has been working with demons. Ann lets out a massive ear-piercing scream and jumps onto the stage but discovers a robot under the hood, not her father. Muniel accuses her of being a demon, but when the crowd begin to assault her, Beelzebub grabs her and flees, reuniting with Rao and Thief. They try to escape, but fall into the river when the bridge is destroyed. However, they are rescued by the Swimmers, who are fishing downstream. It is there that they discover the Aquanium is fake and that Muniel and Bred had laid an elaborate trap to catch them.
10	"Muniel's Urn"; Transliteration: "Munieru no Tsubo" (Japanese: ムニエルの壺)	Wakiko Kume	April 10, 2024
In a flashback to years earlier, it is shown that Ann's mother and the Forest Land queen, Lilith, was a demon and daughter of Lucifer. When Ann found an Aquanium crystal in the castle, Lilith took it to her father for safekeeping but she was seen by Bred. Later, Muniel staged a coup d'état, exposed Lilith as a demon and captured her inside a magical urn. Muniel now has the urn and launches an attack in an aerial battleship to retrieve the fifth and remaining piece of Aquanium from the demons in Sand Land. While Lucifer initially treats Muniel with disdain, when he begins to use his demon power, he too becomes imprisoned in an urn. Muniel and Bred locate the Aquanium, destroy the demon village and return to Forest Land.
11	"Flying Fortress Garam"; Transliteration: "Kūchū Yōsai Garamu" (Japanese: 空中要塞ガラム)	Fumito Yamada	April 17, 2024
With all five Aquanium crystals in their possession, Muniel and Bred activate the gigantic anti-gravity Flying Fortress Garam built many years ago by the Picchi and prepare to launch an attack on Sand Land. Meanwhile, General Are and his tanks arrive at Rao's camp where learn of Muniel's test blast from Garam which destroys the entire mountain were the Forest Land resistance fighters were based. Fortunately, they were warned in time by the Swimmers and escaped before the blast, joining Rao and Are. Beelzebub proposes that their combined forces attack the Garam while his small group tries to get inside and overcome its operators. Rao utilizes an attack by a hungry Geji Dragon to catapult their sand tank with himself, Ann, Thief and Beelzebub up into Garam.
12	"The Final Battle!"; Transliteration: "Saishū Kessen!!" (Japanese: 最終決戦!!)	Kōji Sasaki	April 24, 2024
Rao's group recover from being catapulted into Garam and head off in their tank to find the control room. They are intercepted by Bred controlling a huge metal exoskeleton so Rao sends Beelzebub off while he and Thief tackle Bred. Meanwhile, Muniel has threatened to destroy the Sand Land capital in one hour when Garam's cannon has recharged. Muniel finds Beelzebub on the ship and engages him in battle while the deadline for the canon to fire approaches. However, Ann manages to cut the power at the last second. Frustrated at almost being beaten by Beelzebub, Muniel ingests a large quantity of Aquanium turning himself into a huge superpowered being.
13	"The Battle Comes to an End"; Transliteration: "Tatakai no Hate ni" (Japanese: 戦いの果てに)	Ayumu Ono	May 1, 2024
With its energy supply diminishing, Garam begins to fall and Ann convinces the crew to evacuate in its escape pods. When she tries to stop Garam from crashing and exploding, Bred comes to her aid after realizing that he was blinded by the lure of power. Meanwhile, Beelzebub is fighting a losing battle against Muniel until Rao comes to his aid and fires his last cannon shell through the wall of Gram, bathing Beelzebub in moonlight and revitalizing him. Beelzebub deals Muniel a massive blow, sending him outside the hole and forcing him to expel the two urns containing Beelzebub's father and sister, which crack open. Rao decides to crash Garam into the only area devoid of life, Doomlands. He, Thief, and Bred take "floaty tablets" and leave the ship while Ann and Beelzebub stay on board until the last minute to slow its descent. When it hits the ground, Lucifer appears and helps control the ensuing blast. Everyone is reunited, and rain begins falling from the exploded Aquanium. Muniel is recalled to heaven to carry out administrative duties for the next 1,000 years while Rao, Thief, Beelzebub and Ann set off on a new adventure.

=== Video game ===
An action role-playing video game based on the series was announced during Summer Game Fest on June 8, 2023. It was developed by ILCA and published by Bandai Namco Entertainment, and uses Unreal Engine 5. The game was released in Japan for the PlayStation 4, PlayStation 5, Xbox Series X/S, and Windows on April 25, 2024, and the following day worldwide.

== Reception ==
=== Manga ===
Greg McElhatton called Sand Land "the ultimate disposable comic, executed perfectly". His review for Read About Comics summarized, refers to it as a fun light story that, while not necessarily deep or memorable, does well to explore the fictional world and the unique characters that inhabit it. Despite Toriyama's complaints about designing the tank, McElhatton praised the art, declaring it more consistent than his previous work Dragon Ball. John Jakala of Anime News Network also called the artwork, and story, superior to Dragon Ball. Jakala said the characters are a big part of the series' charm, claiming Toriyama did a "masterful job" establishing the look and personality of each character in the first chapter.

=== Anime ===
At the 2023 Fantasia International Film Festival, the film adaptation of Sand Land won a Special Jury Mention in the Excellence in Animation category. The film opened at number six at the Japanese box office, and grossed US$2.98 million by its third week. Evan Mullicane of Screen Rant strongly praised the film, writing that it "proves that the original Sand Land manga is Toriyama's true opus." He found the "seamless" blend of 3D and 2D animation creates a distinctive look that captures Toriyama's artwork "beautifully", and noted that the film's best moments are all based on developing the three central characters.

Writing for Anime News Network, Kalai Chik called the film a "feel good popcorn movie" and gave it a B+ rating. They cited the script as its strongest feature; "For a story that touches on the impacts of war, global warming, and corporate greed, it never overcomplicates the message, nor does it talk down to the audience." Although they praised the music, Chik noted it also exposes the "underutilized animation".

Giving the film three out of five stars, Matt Schley of The Japan Times called it a straightforward romp that is "fun first and foremost", but leaves the audience with deeper themes to contemplate. He praised the banter between the three main characters as entertaining, with Mutsumi Tamura's Beelzebub being "especially endearing", and the supporting characters for highlighting Toriyama's skill for visual gags. Although Schley wrote that the story and CG animation in Sand Land are not likely to disappoint audiences, he noted that there is "nothing particularly revolutionary" about it and suggested it could have been slightly shorter in length.
