= Batman Ninja vs. Yakuza League =

2025 animated superhero film

- Release poster

Japanese name
- Kanji: バットマン・ニンジャ vs. ヤクザ・リーグ
Transcriptions
- Revised Hepburn: Battoman ninja vs. Yakuza rīgu
- Directed by: Junpei Mizusaki; Shinji Takagi
- Screenplay by: Kazuki Nakashima
- Based on: Batman by: Bob Kane; Bill Finger
- Produced by: Tetsuro Satomi
- Starring: Koichi Yamadera; Daisuke Ono; Akira Ishida; Kengo Kawanishi; Yuki Kaji; Hōchū Ōtsuka; Masaki Terasoma; Wataru Takagi; Rie Kugimiya; Nobuyuki Hiyama; Romi Park; Akio Otsuka; Ayane Sakura; Kazuhiro Yamaji; Takaya Kamikawa
- Music by: Yugo Kanno
- Production companies: Warner Bros. Japan; Warner Bros. Animation; DC Entertainment; Kamikaze Douga
- Distributed by: Warner Bros. Home Entertainment
- Release dates: March 18, 2025 (United States); March 21, 2025 (Japan)
- Running time: 89 minutes
- Countries: United States; Japan
- Languages: English; Japanese

Batman Ninja vs. Yakuza League (Japanese: ニンジャバットマン対ヤクザリーグ, Hepburn: Ninja Battoman tai Yakuza Rīgu) is a 2025 animated superhero film directed by Junpei Mizusaki and Shinji Takagi, based on the DC Comics character Batman. It is the sequel to Batman Ninja (2018) and features Batman and his allies fighting to protect Gotham City from an invasion of yakuza-style criminals led by an alternate version of the Justice League.

== Plot ==
A day after returning from the past, Batman and his allies discover that the world is not the same as they left it. Japan no longer exists and neither do the heroes of the Justice League. Also, yakuza are raining from the skies. The yakuza belong to Hinomoto, a Japan from a parallel universe, and are using an interdimensional rift above Gotham City to invade Earth. On Earth, only the people who previously time-traveled can see the rift.

Batman and Robin use the rift to travel to Hinomoto, while Nightwing, Red Hood, and Red Robin stay behind to capture the remaining yakuza. The Bat family are soon ambushed by the Yakuza League, a corrupt counterpart of the missing Justice League and the leading group of the Hagane yakuza clan who took over Hinomoto. The first three Yakuza League members whom the Bat family encounter are Zeshika the Emerald Ray (an alternate Jessica Cruz-Green Lantern), the second-in-command Asha the Aqua Dragon (an alternate Aquaman), and Bari the Fleet-Footed (an alternate Barry Allen-Flash). The Bat family defends themselves and wards off the Yakuza League with additional help from the Amazone, an opposing Yakuza clan led by Daiana the Eagle Goddess (an alternate Wonder Woman).

At Amazone base, Daiana explains the rise of the Hagane clan at Hinomoto; the country consisted solely of yakuza families fighting one another. Recently, a clan leader was Deio Domuzu (an alternate Doomsday) and was killed by Kuraku, the Yakuza League leader (an alternate Superman). Because the Hagane clan became corrupted and lost the yakuza code of honor, the Amazone is the only opposing group left. The Harley Quinn from Batman's timeline is aiding Daiana. She and Joker escaped from prison after hearing the news of yakuza invasions in Gotham.

While departing for Gotham, Batman and Robin are ambushed by Kuraku, and discover that Robin's grandfather, Ra's al Ghul, was responsible for the current reality, having acquired Gorilla Grodd's Quake Engine and upgraded it into the Four-Dimensional Origami System, using it to manipulate parts of Earth's history, creating Hinomoto along with the Yakuza League and ruling it. As the Hagane clan kidnap Robin, Batman is rescued by Joker and Harley, with Joker only rescuing Batman so he can be the one to kill him. However, Joker immediately flees to avoid being killed by Kuraku, while Daiana rescues Harley. Before retreating, Kuraku warns Daiana that the Amazone will be disposed for helping the Bat family.

At Hagane Castle, Ra's reveals to Robin his true plan to use the combined power of both the Yakuza league and the yakuza of Hinomoto to annihilate Gotham and the rest of the world, to remake the Earth in his image. At the Batcave, the rest of the Bat family coordinates the plans to counteract the Yakuza League before returning to the Hagane base.

Meanwhile, the Yakuza League attacks the Amazone base. The Bat family rescues the Amazone clan and defeats Asha, Zeshika and Bari, leaving Batman to personally fight Kuraku while Robin escapes from his prison. Having prepared with gear designed against Kryptonians, including a Kryptonite brass knuckle which Superman entrusted to him before he vanished, Batman subdues Kuraku.

When Ra's deactivated the limiters on the Origami System by removing a key, leaving it to exist in multiple dimensions and rendering it untouchable, it causes the Hagane base to appear on Earth and falls to crush Gotham. The Bat family tries to tether the device so they can deactivate it while Daiana fights Ra's to recover the key. However, when the temporal paradox from the Origami System causes both her and the Yakuza League to receive visions of their heroic counterparts, Batman goes to capture Ra's from escaping and retrieves the key to stop the device. The temporal paradox from the engine causes the Yakuza League to reform and transform into Hinomoto's Justice League heroes and follow their counterparts' heroic paths, now joined by a transformed Daiana. When the Bat family finish their parts on shutting down the Origami System thanks to Harley, the Hinomoto-Justice League returns the castle to their timeline and thanks them for everything. Batman's timeline is then fully restored.

== Voice cast ==
Character	Japanese voice actor	English dubbing actor
Bruce Wayne / Batman: A hero who usually resides in Gotham City.	Koichi Yamadera	Joe Daniels
Dick Grayson / Nightwing: former first Robin, member of the Bat-family	Daisuke Ono	Houston Hayes
Jason Todd / Red Hood: former second Robin, member of the Bat-family.	Akira Ishida	David Matranga
Tim Drake / Red Robin: former third Robin, member of the Bat-family.	Kengo Kawanishi	Nathan Wilson
Damian Wayne / Robin: The son of Batman and the current Robin, a member of the Bat-family.	Yuki Kaji	Bryson Baugus
Alfred Pennyworth: Batman's sarcastic, intelligent butler.	Hōchū Ōtsuka	David Harbold
James Gordon: Police commissioner of Gotham City and ally of Batman.	Masaki Terasoma	John Gremillion
Joker: A sadistic, dangerous, and psychopathic master criminal in Gotham City and an archnemesis of Batman and Red Hood.	Wataru Takagi	Scott Gibbs
"Harin, the Wild Jester"/ Harley Quinn: Joker's girlfriend, who is possibly even more insane than him.	Rie Kugimiya	Karlii Hoch
"Daiana Amazone, the Eagle Goddess" / Princess Diana / Wonder Woman: The leader of the Amazone Family who had been fighting to protect vulnerable women from the Hagane Family and its Yakuza League. She becomes an immediate ally to the Batman Family and remains heroic as her original counterpart.	Romi Park	Molly Searcy
"Zeshika the Emerald Ray" / Jessica Cruz / Green Lantern: A member of the Yakuza League and a gambler who stumbled upon the power of the Green Lantern ring.	Ayane Sakura	Annie Wild
"Ahsa, the Aqua Dragon" / Arthur Curry / Aquaman: A second-in-command of the Yakuza League, and a descendant of a race who lives at the lake of Hinomoto. He was a childhood friend of Daiana.	Akio Otsuka	Cyrus Rodas
"Bari, the Fleet of Foot" / Barry Allen / The Flash: A member of the Yakuza League, who got his power after being struck by lightning at an onsen.	Nobuyuki Hiyama	Benjamin McLaughlin
"Kuraku, The Man of Steel" / Superman: Lead Protector of the Hagane Family and leader of the Yakuza League.	Takaya Kamikawa	Aaron Campbell
Ra's al Ghul: The leader of the League of Assassins who is also the maternal grandfather of Damian and the former mentor of Bruce. He uses a Quake Engine system to alter the timeline where most Justice League members are yakuzas, especially turning the version of Superman into his loyal pawn.	Kazuhiro Yamaji	John Swasey
"Deiō Dōmuzu" / Doomsday: The former leader of the Hagane Family until Kuraku killed him and took over the family before the event.	Tesshō Genda	Tesshō Genda

== Production ==
In late May 2024, it was announced that the sequel to Batman Ninja was in development, with Junpei Mizusaki returning to direct and Kazuki Nakashima writing the screenplay, with Koichi Yamadera reprising his role as Bruce Wayne / Batman.

== Marketing ==
In July 2024, during the Anime Expo, the teaser trailer was released, revealing Damian Wayne / Robin, Barry Allen / Flash, Princess Diana / Wonder Woman, and Arthur Curry / Aquaman.

== Release ==
Batman Ninja vs. Yakuza League was released on digital download on March 18, 2025, and on Ultra HD Blu-ray, Blu-ray, and DVD on April 15.
