= Batman Ninja =

2018 superhero film

- North American cover
- ニンジャバットマン
- Directed by: Junpei Mizusaki
- Screenplay by: Kazuki Nakashima (Japanese version); Leo Chu (American version); Eric S. Garcia (American version)
- Based on: Batman by: Bob Kane; Bill Finger
- Produced by: Tetsuro Satomi (Japanese version); Leo Chu (American version); Eric S. Garcia (American version)
- Starring: Roger Craig Smith; Tony Hale; Grey Griffin; Tara Strong; Fred Tatasciore
- Edited by: Kiyoshi Hirose
- Music by: Yugo Kanno
- Production companies: Warner Bros. Japan; DC Entertainment; Kamikaze Douga; YamatoWorks; Barnum Studio
- Distributed by: Warner Bros. Pictures
- Release dates: April 24, 2018 (United States); June 15, 2018 (Japan)
- Running time: 85 minutes
- Countries: United States; Japan
- Languages: English; Japanese

Batman Ninja (ニンジャバットマン, Ninja Batman) is a 2018 American-Japanese animated superhero film directed by Junpei Mizusaki, produced by Warner Bros., and animated by Kamikaze Douga and YamatoWorks, which features the DC Comics character Batman and several of his allies and enemies who end up time-traveling to feudal Japan. Takashi Okazaki, the creator of Afro Samurai, was the character designer for the film.

The film was released in the United States in digital format on April 24, 2018: it was released in physical formats on May 8 and was released theatrically in Japan on June 15. In its American release, writers Leo Chu and Eric Garcia rewrote the film from the original Japanese script written by Kazuki Nakashima, ultimately making two very different versions of the same film.

This was one of the posthumous releases for longtime DC producer Benjamin Melniker, who died two months before its release.

A sequel, Batman Ninja vs. Yakuza League, released on March 18, 2025.

== Plot ==
While battling Gorilla Grodd at Arkham Asylum, Batman is caught in Grodd's time displacement machine, dubbed the "Quake Engine", and sent to feudal Japan. There, he is chased by Ashigaru samurai soldiers working for the Joker. During his escape, Batman meets up with Catwoman, who reveals everyone else arrived two years earlier due to Batman being in the outermost area affected by the Quake Engine. He learns from her that all of Gotham City's top criminals have become feudal lords after deceiving the Sengoku daimyo, battling each other until only one state remains. To stop the villains from altering history, Batman and Catwoman must get to the Quake Engine in Arkham Castle (formerly the Asylum).

Batman discovers that Alfred Pennyworth is also in the past and has built a Batcave outside Edo. When Joker's troops ambush the hideout, Batman storms his way in his Batmobile towards Arkham Castle, which transforms into a robot fortress. As Batman confronts the Joker, he is forced to leave and save a mother and child from being crushed by the robot's hand. He transforms his Batcycle into an armored suit to defeat Bane and stop the robot hand, only to learn the mother is a disguised Harley Quinn. As Batman is surrounded by the Joker's minions, he is whisked away by ninja led by Eian of the Bat Clan of Hida.

Batman learns the Bat Clan helped Nightwing, Red Hood, Red Robin and Robin upon their arrival and the clan has followed a prophecy of a foreign bat ninja restoring order to the land. Robin gives Batman an invitation from Grodd to a nearby hot spring. There, Grodd explains he intended to send the villains away so he could take Gotham for himself, but Batman's interference sent them to feudal Japan instead. Batman and Grodd agree to work together to return to Gotham. Batman, Grodd, Catwoman, the Bat-Family and the Bat Clan battle the Joker and his forces by the river.

They defeat the Joker and Harley, but Grodd turns on Batman, revealing his alliance with Two-Face before the Joker and Harley escape and blow up their own ship, taking Batman down with it. Having captured a power converter from Harley, Catwoman attempts to bargain with Grodd in bringing her back to Gotham; however, they need to obtain other power converters from the Penguin, Poison Ivy and Deathstroke to complete the Quake Engine. Two days later, Batman recovers from his wounds and encourages the Bat-Family to learn the ways of the ninja to defeat Grodd.

Red Hood locates Joker and Harley, but Batman discovers they lost their memories from the explosion and are living as farmers. A month later, the villains mobilize their castle robots for battle at the "Field of Hell". Batman leads the Bat-Family and the Bat Clan into the battlefield. After defeating the other villains, Grodd controls them with the intent of ruling Japan himself. The Joker and Harley crash his party from above, reclaiming their castle from Grodd. The Bat-Family saves Catwoman and Grodd before the Joker merges all of the castles into the super robot Lord Joker.

An injured Grodd gives the control of his army of monkeys to Batman. Robin enables them to merge into one giant samurai monkey, who in turn fuses with a swarm of bats to form the "Batgod". The Joker reveals to Batman that as farmers, he and Harley planted special flowers that restored their memories after blooming. As the castle falls, Batman and the Joker engage in a sword fight. Using his ninjutsu skills, Batman defeats the Joker. With the Joker and the villains defeated, the Bat Clan begins work to restore feudal Japan and the Bat-Family returns the villains to the present day.

In a mid-credits scene, Catwoman sells weapons and furniture from the castle robots to an antique shop, while Bruce rides a horse-driven Batmobile to a party hosted by the mayor.

== Voice cast ==
Character	Japanese voice actor	English dubbing actor
Bruce Wayne / Batman: A powerful superhero who usually resides in Gotham City. Upon being transported to Feudal Japan, he has a hard time adjusting but ultimately gains the trust of the Bat Clan. After returning to the present, he uses his skills he gained in Japan to protect his friends.	Kōichi Yamadera	Roger Craig Smith
The Joker: A sociopathic villain and Batman's archenemy. Unlike most versions of Joker, he is a skilled fighter, wielding razor-sharp fans and katanas.	Wataru Takagi	Tony Hale
Selina Kyle / Catwoman: An accomplished thief who has a love-hate relationship with Batman.	Ai Kakuma	Grey Griffin
Harley Quinn: Joker's girlfriend and sidekick.	Rie Kugimiya	Tara Strong
Alfred Pennyworth: Batman's butler and father figure.	Hōchū Ōtsuka	Adam Croasdell
Gorilla Grodd: A villainous, intelligent gorilla who possesses psychic powers.	Takehito Koyasu	Fred Tatasciore
Dick Grayson / Nightwing: The original Robin, who is now a master ninja. He is inquisitive and short-tempered, but cares about the Bat-Family.	Daisuke Ono	Adam Croasdell
Damian Wayne / Robin: The son of Batman and the current Robin, who was raised by the League of Assassins.	Yūki Kaji	Yuri Lowenthal
Jason Todd / Red Hood: The second Robin, who was killed by Joker and became Red Hood after being resurrected.	Akira Ishida	Yuri Lowenthal
Tim Drake: The third Robin, who is now known as Red Robin. He is a skilled detective, similar to Batman, and wields a bo staff.	Kengo Kawanishi	Will Friedle
Deathstroke: An assassin and occasional foe of Batman. Blind in one eye, he seeks to kill Batman at any cost, presumably just for the fun of it.	Junichi Suwabe	Fred Tatasciore
Poison Ivy: A brilliant but sociopathic eco-terrorist who can control plants and other people.	Atsuko Tanaka	Tara Strong
Two-Face: A former district attorney who was scarred by Sal Maroni and became a criminal. He relies on a coin to plan his next move.	Toshiyuki Morikawa	Eric Bauza
The Penguin: A disfigured but distinguished aristocrat, Oswald Cobblepot fits in perfectly with the tendencies of Japanese society. He establishes his mecha so that the inside looks like a glacier, so he can feel at home.	Chō	Tom Kenny
Bane: A dangerous assassin who derives his strength from the steroid Venom.	Kenta Miyake	Kenta Miyake
Eian: The leader of the Bat Clan, which worships Batman as a god.	Yōji Ueda	Matthew Yang King
Monkichi: A monkey that Robin adopts. He is friends with Monmi, and is trusted with a flute that can control other monkeys.	Anna Mugiho	Anna Mugiho
Monmi: A friend of Monkichi who helps in the final battle.	Juri Nagatsuma	Juri Nagatsuma

== Marketing ==
The first poster was revealed on October 5, 2017, and the trailers were released later on December 1, 2017.

Bandai released S.H.Figuarts figures of Ninja Batman and Demon King Joker in mid-2018. The Nendoroid figures of Pop Team Epic characters Popuko and Pipimi, dressed as Batman and Joker respectively, were displayed at the Warner Bros. booth at AnimeJapan 2018. It was suggested by Junpei Mizusaki at Kamikaze Douga; the studio animated both this film and Pop Team Epic television series. The crossover figures were accompanied by a 15-second TV commercial, where Popuko and Pipimi (in the aforementioned costumes) re-enact a sketch from Pop Team Epic comics before it jumps to a Batman Ninja scene.

A manga adaptation by Masato Hisa was serialized in the Monthly Hero's magazine from June 30, 2018, to September 1, 2019. It was collected in two volumes.

== Reception ==
On review aggregator website Rotten Tomatoes, the film received an approval rating of 82% based on 17 reviews, with an average rating of 6.6/10.

IGN awarded Batman Ninja a score of 9.7 out of 10, saying, "DC tried something new by bringing in visionary Japanese animators to offer a refreshing take on one of the company's most beloved characters, and the finished product not only built upon the great adaptations that have come before, but surpassed them."

The film earned $793,653 from domestic DVD sales and $3,083,838 from domestic Blu-ray sales, bringing its total domestic home video earnings to $3,877,491.

In 2020, the manga adaptation won the Seiun Award for Best Comic.

== Sequel ==
A sequel, Batman Ninja vs. Yakuza League was announced, with the Japanese cast and crew returning to reprise their roles.
