= Kamikaze Douga =

Japanese animation studio

Kamikaze Douga Co., Ltd.
- Native name: 有限会社神風動画
- Romanized name: Yūgen gaisha Kamikaze Dōga
- Type: Kabushiki gaisha
- Founded: June 21, 2003; 23 years ago
- Founder: Junpei Mizusaki
- Headquarters: Takadanobaba, Shibuya, Tokyo, Japan
- Key people: Junpei Mizusaki (president & CEO)
- Services: Animation
- Number of employees: 73
- Website: kamikazedouga.co.jp

Kamikaze Douga Co., Ltd. (Japanese: 有限会社神風動画, Hepburn: Yūgen gaisha Kamikaze Dōga) is a Japanese animation studio. It was founded on May 23, 2003, by Junpei Mizusaki. It is located in Shibuya, Tokyo.

== Works ==
=== Anime television series ===
Year	Títle	Director	Eps.	Source	Refs.
2018–22	Pop Team Epic (co-animated with Space Neko Company, season 2)	Jun Aoki; Aoi Umeki (season 1)	24 (Note: Two specials were released on April 1, 2019.)	Manga	
2020	My Roomie Is a Dino (co-animated with Space Neko Company)	Jun Aoki	12	Manga	

=== Anime films ===
Year	Títle	Director	Source	Notes and Refs.
2008	Tokyo Onlypic	Various	Original	segment "Women Hell Marathon"
2017	Cocolors	Toshihisa Yokoshima	Original	
2019	Batman Ninja (co-animated with YamatoWorks)	Junpei Mizusaki	Comic	
2023	Sand Land (co-animated with Sunrise and Anima)	Toshihisa Yokoshima	Manga	
2025	Batman Ninja vs. Yakuza League	Junpei Mizusaki; Shinji Takagi	Comic	

=== OVAs and ONAs ===
Year	Títle	Director	Eps.	Source	Notes and Refs.
2003	No. 5	—	—	Original	—
2021	Star Wars: Visions	Various	27	Film	2 episodes
2024	Sand Land: The Series (co-animated with Sunrise and Anima)	Toshihisa Yokoshima	13	Manga	
2028	Ghost of Tsushima: Legends	Takanobu Mizuno	TBA	Video game	

=== Collaborations in anime and video games ===
- Freedom (opening/ending, 2006)
- Kouchuu Ouja Mushiking: Mori no Tami no Densetsu (2007)
- Shin Megami Tensei: Persona (cinematics, 2009)
- JoJo's Bizarre Adventure (Openings in parts 1 to 3 and 6, 2012–2022)
- Gatchaman Crowds (opening, 2013)
- SoniAni: Super Sonico The Animation (ending, 2014)
- Terra Formars (ending)
- Gatchaman Crowds Insight (opening, 2015)
- Wooser's Day Life Dream Edition (opening, 2015)
- Touken Ranbu: Hanamaru (ending, 2016)
- Idolish7 (opening, 2018)
