= Yugo Kanno =

Japanese composer and musician (born 1977)

Yugo Kanno 菅野 祐悟
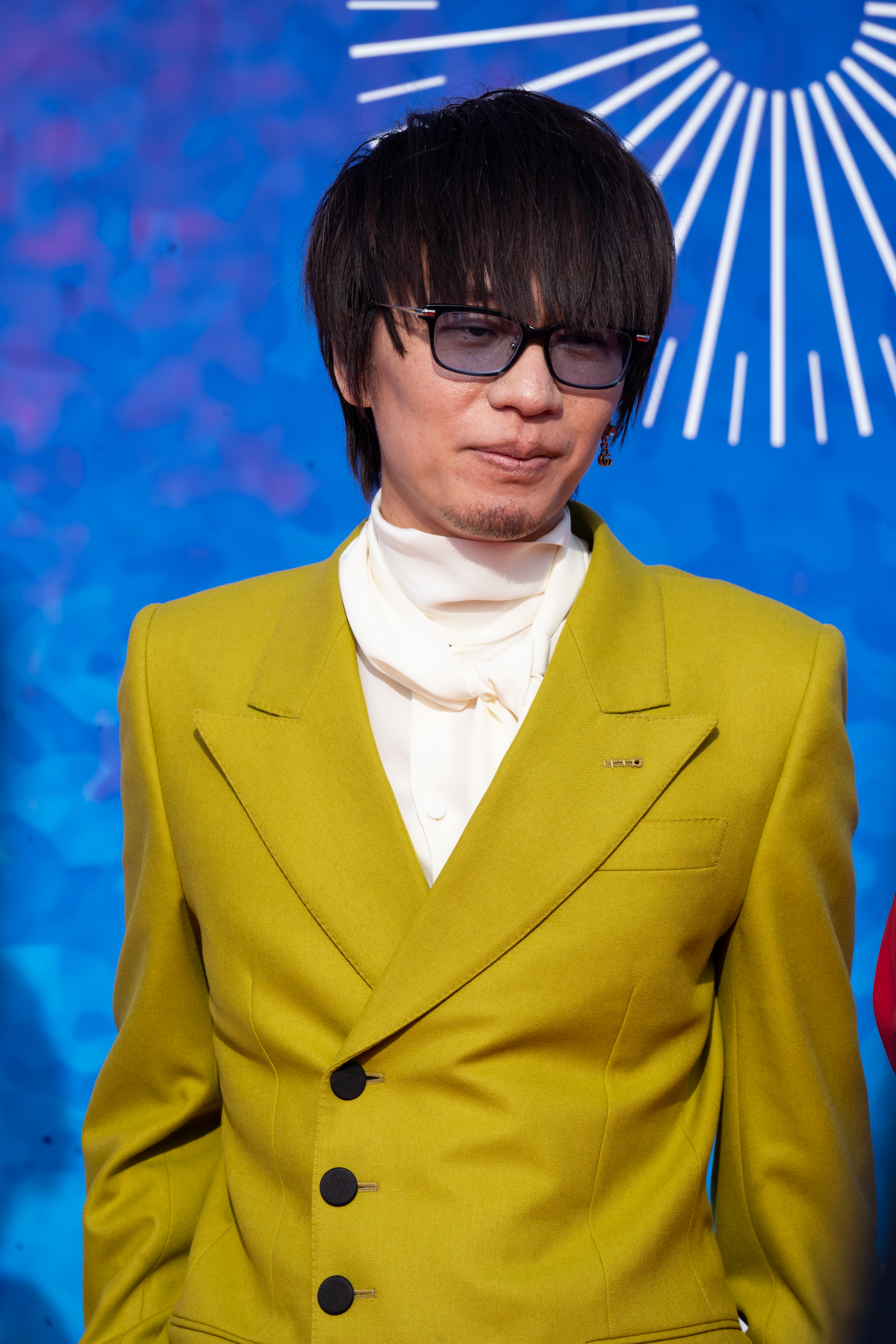

Background information
- Born: June 5, 1977 (age 49); Saitama, Japan
- Genres: Orchestral; classical; jazz; acoustic; rock; electronic
- Occupations: Composer; musician; sound producer; painter
- Instruments: Keyboard; piano; acoustic guitar
- Years active: 2002–present
- Website: yugokanno.com

Yugo Kanno (菅野 祐悟, Kanno Yūgo; born June 5, 1977) is a Japanese composer and musician known for his work on many television dramas, anime series, and movies.

== Biography ==
Kanno was born in Saitama, Japan. He attended junior high school in Kawagoe before later moving to Takanezawa for university. While attending school, he was fascinated by Impressionist Music. He graduated from the Tokyo College of Music, department of composition, film scoring course and started providing music for movies, commercials, and artists while he was still a student.

On December 14, 2007, Kanno held his first orchestral concert which, according to his website, "started with a strong desire to listen to live music." His first orchestra concert was held at Suntory Hall's Blue Rose in 2007. His first 2-day Valentines concert was held at Bunkamura Orchard Hall in 2014, Yupoto Hall in 2015, Mielparque Hall in 2016, Hitomi Memorial Hall in 2017/2018, and Sakura Hall in 2019, and was well received. He also participated in several collaborations such as 2014 "Yugo Kanno x Junichi Hirokami x Kyoto City Symphony Orchestra", "Yugo Kanno x MOZU Concert", "Gunshi Kanbei Talk & Concert", 2015 "Kizuna Concert", and amongst others. Furthermore, in 2016, "Symphony No. 1 ~ The Border ~" was premiered by Kansai Phil in April 2019. In 2012 he began work as a painter after casually painting a portrait of a friend who came by while he was in the industry

Under the influence of his father, he grew up listening to jazz and classical music from an early age. He started learning the piano at the age of four, became obsessed with soccer and piano in elementary school, and lived a sensitive boyhood in junior high school, taking charge of percussion instruments in his school's brass band club. After entering high school, he started giving composing lessons and aimed to enter a music college. In 1997, he entered the university of Tokyo College of Music. In 2004, he made his debut at the age of 27 in the Fuji TV drama series "Last Christmas". Since then, he has been active in a wide range of music production such as movies, TV dramas, animations, and documentaries.

In 2010, he won the Japanese Movie Critics Award "Movie Music Artist Award" and the Japan Theater Staff Film Festival Music Award for "Amalfi: Rewards of the Goddess". In May 2014, he won the Monthly Galaxy Award, and in June 2015, he received the Encouragement Award as a composer for a play in the 52nd Galaxy Awards in the TV category.

== Discography ==
=== Television works ===
Title	Year	Role(s)
Last Christmas	2004	Composer
Ai no Uta	2005	Composer
Engine	2005	Composer
M no Higeki	2005	Composer
Rondo	2006	Composer
Attention Please	2006	Composer
Suppli	2006	Composer
Woman's Island	2006	Composer
Yuuki	2006	Composer
Akechi Mitsuhide	2007	Composer
Attention Please SP	2007	Composer
Bambino!	2007	Composer
Galileo (season 1)	2007	Composer (other tracks by Masaharu Fukuyama)
Haken no Hinkaku	2007	Composer
Hotaru no Hikari	2007	Composer
Romeo and Juliet	2007	Composer
SP	2007	Composer
Akai Ito	2008	Composer
Ano Hi, Bokura no Inochi wa Toilet Paper yori mo Karukatta	2008	Composer
Attention Please SP	2008	Composer
Innocent Love	2008	Composer
Osen	2008	Composer
Sensei wa Erai!	2008	Composer
Shibatora	2008	Composer
The Waste Land	2009	Composer (other tracks by Ryuichi Sakamoto)
Hataraku Gon!	2009	Composer
Kiina	2009	Composer
Koishite Akuma	2009	Composer
Mr. Brain	2009	Composer (other tracks by MAYUKO, Akio Izutsu, Kyosuke Kamisaka & Kenichiro Suehiro)
Samurai High School	2009	Composer
Hotaru no Hikaru 2	2010	Composer
Mioka	2010	Composer
Nakanai to Kimeta Hi	2010	Composer
Ogon no Buta	2010	Composer
Shinzanmono	2010	Composer
Akujotachi no Mesu	2011	Composer
Diplomat Kosaku Kuroda	2011	Composer
Nazotoki wa Dinner no Ato de	2011	Composer
Shiawase ni Narou yo	2011	Composer (other tracks by MAYUKO, Akio Izutsu, Kyosuke Kamisaka & Kenichiro Suehiro)
Umareru.	2011	Composer
37-sai de Isha ni Natta Boku ~Kenshui Junjo Monogatari~	2012	Composer
Dirty Mama!	2012	Composer
Double Face	2012	Composer
Ghost Mama Sousasen	2012	Composer
Kaitakushatachi	2012	Composer
Nazotoki wa Dinner no Ato de SP	2012	Composer
Resident – 5-nin no Kenshui	2012	Composer
Ando Lloyd ~A.I. Knows Love?~	2013	Composer
Galileo (season 2)	2013	Composer (other tracks by Masaharu Fukuyama)
Share House no Koibito	2013	Composer
Take Five	2013	Composer
Gunshi Kanbei	2014	Composer
Hanasaki Mai ga Damatte Inai	2014	Composer
Hirugao ~Heijitsu Gogo 3-ji no Koibitotachi~	2014	Composer
Mozu	2014	Composer
Beautiful Bones: Sakurako's Investigation	2017	Composer
Uchi no Otto wa Shigoto ga Dekinai	2017	Composer
Nurse In Action!	2019	Composer (Other Tracks by Akihiro Manabe)
Fake Affair	2019	Composer
Sherlock: Untold Stories	2019	Composer

=== Anime works ===
Title	Year	Role(s)
Da Capo	2003	Composer (other tracks by Hikaru Nanase)
Ikki Tousen: Battle Vixens	2003	Composer (other tracks by Hiroshi Motokura & Yoshiki Minami)
Giniro no Olynssis	2006	Composer
Hataraki Man	2006	Composer
Birdy the Mighty: Decode	2008	Composer
Toshokan Sensō	2008	Composer
Birdy the Mighty: Decode 02	2009	Composer
Birdy the Mighty Decode: Cipher	2009	Composer
Library War: The Wings of Revolution	2012	Composer
Psycho-Pass	2012	Composer
JoJo's Bizarre Adventure: Stardust Crusaders	2014	Composer
Gundam Reconguista in G	2014	Composer
Psycho-Pass 2	2014	Composer
JoJo's Bizarre Adventure: Stardust Crusaders Egypt Arc	2015	Composer (ending 2 theme song arrangement and composition)
Ajin: Demi-Human	2016	Composer
JoJo's Bizarre Adventure: Diamond Is Unbreakable	2016	Composer
Blame!	2017	Composer
Record of Grancrest War	2018	Composer
JoJo's Bizarre Adventure: Golden Wind	2018	Composer
Psycho-Pass 3	2019	Composer
Levius	2019	Composer
The Millionaire Detective Balance: Unlimited	2020	Composer
2.43: Seiin High School Boys Volleyball Team	2021	Composer
Cells at Work! Code Black	2021	Composer
Resident Evil: Infinite Darkness	2021	Composer
JoJo's Bizarre Adventure: Stone Ocean	2021	Composer
Pluto	2023	Composer
Shinkalion: Change the World	2024	Composer
Star Wars: Visions	2025	Episode: "The Ninth Jedi: Child of Hope"
Steel Ball Run: JoJo's Bizarre Adventure	2026	Composer
Liar Game	2026	Composer
Grow Up Show: Sunflower Circus	2026	Composer

=== Movie works ===
Title	Year	Role(s)
Shiroi Hato	N/A	Composer
Hirosue which? Project	2002	Composer
Heat Island	2007	Composer
Smile: Seiya no Kiseki	2007	Composer
Akai Ito	2008	Composer
Shaolin Girl	2008	Composer
Suspect X	2008	Composer
Amalfi: Rewards of the Goddess	2009	Composer
Black Gaisha ni Tsutometerundaga mo Ore wa Genkai Kamo Shirenai	2009	Composer
Kaiji	2009	Composer
Magare! Spoon	2009	Composer
Bayside Shakedown 3	2010	Composer
SP: The Motion Picture	2010	Composer
SP: The Motion Picture II	2011	Composer
Andalusia: Revenge of the Goddess	2011	Composer
Kaiji 2	2011	Composer
Kochira Katsushika-ku Kameari Kōen-mae Hashutsujo The Movie: Kachidoki Bashi wo Fuusaseyo!	2011	Composer
Bayside Shakedown: The Final	2012	Composer
Hotaru no Hikari	2012	Composer
The Wings of the Kirin	2012	Composer
Manatsu no Hōteishiki	2013	Composer(other tracks by Masaharu Fukuyama)
Nazotoki wa Dinner no Ato de	2013	Composer
The Intermission	2013	Composer
March Comes in like a Lion	2017	Composer
Batman Ninja	2018	Composer
Kasane	2018	Composer
Psycho-Pass: Sinners of the System	2019	Composer
Human Lost	2019	Composer
At the End of the Matinee	2019	Composer
Kaiji: Final Game	2020	Composer
Brave: Gunjō Senki	2021	Composer
Detective Conan: The Bride of Halloween	2022	Composer
Silent Parade	2022	Composer
Detective Conan: Black Iron Submarine	2023	Composer
Sand Land	2023	Composer
Requiem	2025	Director and composer
Detective Conan: The Million-dollar Pentagram	2024	Composer
Batman Ninja vs. Yakuza League	2025	Composer
Kusunoki no Bannin †	2026	Composer

Key
†	Denotes films that have not yet been released

=== Game works ===
Game title	Year	Role(s)
Rain	2013	Composer
Nioh	2017	Composer
Nioh 2	2020	Composer(other tracks by Akihiro Manabe)
Nioh 3	2026	Composer(other tracks by Akihiro Manabe)

=== Original works ===
Title	Year	Role(s)
Trombone Concerto "Flower"	2011	Composer
Yugo Kanno Meets Art & Music: Spin-Off Work From the Movie The Intermission	2013	Composer
Revive: Concerto for Koto, Shakuhachi and Orchestra	2013-2014	Composer
Symphony No.1 "The Border"	2016	Composer
Symphony No.2 "Alles ist Architektur"	2019	Composer
