= Hotaru no Hikari (manga) =

Japanese manga series by Satoru Hiura

ホタルノヒカリ
- Genre: Romance
- Manga

Hotaru no Hikari: It's Only Little Light in My Life
- Written by: Satoru Hiura
- Published by: Kodansha
- English publisher: NA: Kodansha USA (digital)
- Imprint: KC Kiss
- Magazine: Kiss
- Original run: 8 August 2004 – 25 June 2009
- Volumes: 15
- Television drama

ホタルノヒカリ (Hotaru no Hikari: It's Only a Little Light in My Life)
- Music by: Yugo Kanno
- Studio: Nippon Television
- Original network: NNS (NTV)
- Original run: 11 July 2007 – 12 September 2007
- Episodes: 10
- Television drama

ホタルノヒカリ 2 (Hotaru no Hikari: It's Only a Little Light in My Life 2)
- Music by: Yugo Kanno
- Studio: Nippon Television
- Original network: NNS (NTV)
- Original run: 7 July 2010 – 15 September 2010
- Episodes: 11
- Live-action film

映画 ホタルノヒカリ (Eiga Hotaru no Hikari ) (Hotaru the Movie: It's Only a Little Light in My Life)
- Directed by: Hiroshi Yoshino
- Written by: Fumie Mizuhashi
- Music by: Yugo Kanno
- Released: 9 June 2012
- Runtime: 110 min
- Manga

Hotaru no Hikari SP
- Written by: Satoru Hiura
- Published by: Kodansha
- Imprint: KC Kiss
- Magazine: Kiss
- Original run: 25 January 2014 – 25 May 2017
- Volumes: 6
- Manga

Hotaru no Hikari BABY
- Written by: Satoru Hiura
- Published by: Kodansha
- Magazine: Kiss
- Original run: 25 October 2017 – 24 April 2021
- Volumes: 5

Hotaru no Hikari (ホタルノヒカリ; lit. 'Hotaru's Light') is a Japanese manga series written and illustrated by Satoru Hiura. It has been adapted as a television drama series (2007–2010), followed by a live action feature film released on 9 June 2012. Kodansha USA licensed the manga for North America. The manga spinoffs are Hotaru no Hikari SP (2014–2017) and Hotaru no Hikari BABY (2017–2021).

== Media ==
=== Manga ===
The series, written and drawn by Satoru Hiura, began in 2004 in Kiss magazine. The first bound volume was published by Kodansha on 10 February 2005. The final chapter appeared in 2009, and fifteen volumes were released. A novel was also released on 11 July 2007 followed by an official guide on 13 July 2007.

A bonus chapter named "Himono to Buchō no Shinkonryokou" (干物と部長の新婚旅行?) was published on the occasion of the release of the film live, before being released in the seventh and last volume of the edition in bunko format on 12 June 2012.

The direct sequel, Hotaru no Hikari SP, has been published since January 2014 in Kiss magazine, with the story set after the marriage between Hotaru and Takano.

=== Drama ===
Season 1 of the television adaptation, titled Hotaru no Hikari: It's Only a Little Light in My Life (ホタルノヒカリ), consisting of 10 episodes, premiered on NTV on 11 July 2007. Season 2 consists of 11 episodes and premiered on 7 July 2010.

==== Cast ====
- Haruka Ayase as Hotaru Amemiya
- Ryoko Kuninaka as Yuka Saegusa
- Kazuki Kato as Makoto Teshima
- Naohito Fujiki as Seiichi Takano

=== Film ===
The romantic comedy film version, titled Eiga Hotaru no Hikari (映画 ホタルノヒカリ), was released in Japan on 9 June 2012 and grossed US$22,720,794.

==== Cast ====
- Haruka Ayase as Hotaru Takano
- Naohito Fujiki as Seiichi Takano
- Yasuko Matsuyuki as Rio Saeki
- Yuya Tegoshi as Yu Saeki
- Yuka Itaya as Sachiko Futatsugi
- Ken Yasuda as Shoji Futatsugi

=== American live-action series ===
In May 2026, it was reported that an American live-action television series adaptation was in production. The series will be produced by Unapologetic Projects, with Paige Hooper, Motoko Kimura, and Kate Kugler producing, and Angela Nissel and Sasha Leigh Henry writing the story.
