= My Roomie Is a Dino =

Japanese manga series and its franchise

- First tankōbon volume cover

ギャルと恐竜 (Gyaru to Kyōryū)
- Genre: Gag comedy; Slice of life
- Manga
- Written by: Moriko Mori
- Illustrated by: Cota Tomimura
- Published by: Kodansha
- English publisher: NA: Kodansha USA (digital)
- Magazine: Weekly Young Magazine
- Original run: October 15, 2018 – January 24, 2022
- Volumes: 7
- Anime television series
- Directed by: Jun Aoki; Kotaro Sudo (Note: Live-action segments)
- Written by: Jun Aoki; Kotaro Sudo
- Music by: Gin
- Studio: Space Neko Company; Kamikaze Douga
- Licensed by: Crunchyroll: SEA: Muse Communication
- Original network: Tokyo MX, BS11
- Original run: April 5, 2020 – December 20, 2020
- Episodes: 12 (24 segments)
- icon

My Roomie Is a Dino, also known as Gal & Dino (Japanese: ギャルと恐竜, Hepburn: Gyaru to Kyōryū) lit. 'The Gyaru and the Dinosaur', is a Japanese manga series written by Moriko Mori and illustrated by Cota Tomimura. It was serialized in Kodansha's seinen manga magazine Weekly Young Magazine from October 2018 to January 2022. Its chapters were collected in seven tankōbon volumes as from April 2019 to March 2022. A 12-episode television series adaptation by Space Neko Company and Kamikaze Douga, each including an animated segment and a live-action segment, aired from April to December 2020.

== Characters ==
Kaede (楓, Kaede)
Voiced by: Miyuri Shimabukuro (Japanese); Macy Anne Johnson (English)
Portrayed by: Nana Yashiro
Yamada (山田, Yamada)
Voiced by: Yūko Natsuyoshi (Japanese); Anairis Quiñones (English)
Senior Colleague (先パイ, Sempai)
Voiced by: Youki Kudoh
Shōta (翔太, Shōta)
Voiced by: Seiichirō Yamashita (Japanese); Yuri Lowenthal (English)

== Media ==
=== Manga ===
My Roomie Is a Dino, written by Moriko Mori and illustrated by Cota Tomimura, was serialized in Kodansha's seinen manga magazine Weekly Young Magazine from October 15, 2018, to January 24, 2022. Kodansha has collected its individual chapters into seven tankōbon volumes from April 2019 to March 2022.

In March 2020, Kodansha USA announced the acquisition of the manga for an English-language digital release.

==== Volumes ====
No.	Original release date	Original ISBN	English release date	English ISBN
1	April 5, 2019	978-4-06-515203-4	March 10, 2020	978-1-64-659340-8
2	September 6, 2019	978-4-06-516992-6	April 14, 2020	978-1-64-659292-0
3	February 6, 2020	978-4-06-518216-1	June 9, 2020	978-1-64-659386-6
4	July 6, 2020	978-4-06-520204-3	November 10, 2020	978-1-64-659804-5
5	February 5, 2021	978-4-06-522305-5	May 11, 2021	978-1-63-699095-8
6	September 6, 2021	978-4-06-524748-8	January 11, 2022	978-1-63-699554-0
7	March 4, 2022	978-4-06-527063-9	August 30, 2022	978-1-68-491411-1

=== Television series ===
An anime and live-action television series adaptation was announced in September 2019. The series is co-animated by Space Neko Company and Kamikaze Douga, with Jun Aoki directing and writing the series' scripts, and Gin composing the series' music. The live-action segments were written and directed by Kotaro Sudo and starred gravure idol Nana Yashiro (professionally known as "8467") as Kaede. It premiered on April 5, 2020, on Tokyo MX and BS11.

On May 12, 2020, it was announced that the airings of Episode 8 and onward were delayed due to the effects of the COVID-19 pandemic; On July 19, 2020, it was announced that both the anime and live-action series would resume in October 2020. the series was rebroadcast from the first episode starting on October 4, 2020, and resumed on November 22, finishing on December 20.

Funimation streamed the series in English-speaking countries under the title of Gal & Dino. An English dub was released on March 5, 2022.

==== Episodes ====
All episodes were written and directed by Jun Aoki.

No.	Title (Note: All English titles are taken from Funimation.)	Original release date
1	"Nice to Meet You!"; Transliteration: "Hajimemashite!" (Japanese: はじめまして！)	April 5, 2020
1	"Look, Kitties!"; Transliteration: "Neko ga Itayo" (Japanese: 猫がいたよ)	April 5, 2020
2	"My Friend's Coming Over"; Transliteration: "Tomodachi ga Yattekitayo" (Japanese: 友だちがやってきたよ)	April 12, 2020
2	"I Ran Into Your Ex"; Transliteration: "Moto Kare to Attayo" (Japanese: 元カレと会ったよ)	April 12, 2020
3	"Goin' Shopping"; Transliteration: "Okaimonodayo" (Japanese: お買い物だよ)	April 19, 2020
3	"Goin' Out and About"; Transliteration: "Michi Oarukuyo" (Japanese: 道を歩くよ)	April 19, 2020
4	"Stop Messing With My Tail!"; Transliteration: "Shippo wa Yamete" (Japanese: しっぽはやめて)	April 26, 2020
4	"Merry Christmas!"; Transliteration: "Merīkurisumasu!" (Japanese: メリークリスマス！)	April 26, 2020
5	"Happy New Year!"; Transliteration: "Yoi Otoshio" (Japanese: 良いお年を)	May 3, 2020
5	"It's Time to Pay Our Respects to the Gods"; Transliteration: "Kamisama ni Goai Satsudayo" (Japanese: 神様にごあいさつだよ)	May 3, 2020
6	"Let's Rent Something"; Transliteration: "Nani o Kariyō Kana" (Japanese: 何を借りようかな)	May 10, 2020
6	"Mikan are So Yummy"; Transliteration: "Mikan Oishīne" (Japanese: みかんおいしいね)	May 10, 2020
7	"I'm Worried About You"; Transliteration: "Shinpaidana" (Japanese: しんぱいだな)	May 17, 2020
7	"Guy Talk"; Transliteration: "Naisho no Ohanashi" (Japanese: ないしょのお話)	May 17, 2020
8	"It Eats More than Just Ramen"; Transliteration: "Rāmen Igai mo Taberuyo" (Japanese: ラーメン以外も食べるよ)	November 22, 2020
8	"Time for a Birthday Party!"; Transliteration: "Bāsudē Pātī Dayo!" (Japanese: バースデーパーティーだよ！)	November 22, 2020
9	"That was Kinda Scary"; Transliteration: "Chotto Kowai" (Japanese: ちょっとこわい)	November 29, 2020
9	"It Loves Going Back to Sleep!"; Transliteration: "Nidone Suruyo!" (Japanese: 二度寝するよ！)	November 29, 2020
10	"We're Friends"; Transliteration: "O Tomodachidayo" (Japanese: おともだちだよ)	December 6, 2020
10	"Calligraphy Time"; Transliteration: "Ji o Kakuyo" (Japanese: 字を書くよ)	December 6, 2020
11	"Helloooo?"; Transliteration: "Moshi Moshi～" (Japanese: もしもし～)	December 13, 2020
11	"No Worries"; Transliteration: "Rakudayo" (Japanese: ラクだよ)	December 13, 2020
12	"Going Out to Eat"; Transliteration: "O-gai de Gohan" (Japanese: お外でご飯)	December 20, 2020
12	"So Peaceful~"; Transliteration: "Heiwa da na～" (Japanese: 平和だな～)	December 20, 2020
