= Wataru Takagi =

Japanese voice actor (born 1966)

- 高木 渉
- Born: July 25, 1966 (age 60); Chiba Prefecture, Japan
- Occupations: Actor; voice actor
- Years active: 1987–present
- Agent: Arts Vision
- Website: Official profile

Wataru Takagi (高木 渉, Takagi Wataru; born July 25, 1966) is a Japanese actor and voice actor from Chiba Prefecture affiliated with Arts Vision.

He is best known for his roles as One Piece (as Bellamy), Bleach (as Ganju Shiba), Detective Conan (as Genta Kojima and Wataru Takagi), After War Gundam X (as Garrod Ran), Slayers Try (as Valgaav), the Beast Wars: Transformers series (as Cheetor), Great Teacher Onizuka (as Eikichi Onizuka), Hajime no Ippo (as Masaru Aoki), Naruto (as Obito Uchiha), the fifth series of GeGeGe no Kitarō (as Nezumi Otoko), Yes! PreCure 5 (as Bunbee), and JoJo's Bizarre Adventure: Diamond Is Unbreakable (as Okuyasu Nijimura). Takagi is also the official Japanese voice of Daffy Duck.

== Career ==
He was a member of Katsuta Voice Actor's Academy.

In 2014, he performed the voice of John H. Watson in the puppetry Sherlock Holmes written by Kōki Mitani. 2 years later, he played Oyamada Shigemasa in the NHK Taiga drama Sanada Maru through Mitani's connection. It was his first appearance in a television drama.

== Filmography ==
=== Anime ===
List of voice performances in anime
Year	Series	Role	Notes	Source
1987	Mister Ajikko	Laborer	Debut role	
1989	Megazone 23 – Part III	EX staff	OAV	
1989	The Guyver: Bio-Booster Armor	Nearchos		
1990	Kyatto Ninden Teyandee	Gotton		
1990	Guardian of Darkness	Student/Rago		
1990	Mobile Suit SD Gundam: SD Gundam Legend	GM Sniper Custom		
1990	The Hakkenden	Unnamed voice	OAV	
1991	Kinkyū Hasshin Saver Kids	Ken Tenjinbayashi		
1991	Judge	Male employee		
1991	Otaku no Video	Kitajima		
1991	Ozanari Dungeon	Soldier A		
1991	Genji Tsūshin Agedama	Tanaka, Suzuki		
1991	Here Is Greenwood	Yanagisawa		
1991	Locke the Superman: New World Command	Pilot		
1991	Otohime Connection	Hayashi-kun		
1992	Video Girl Ai	staff member		
1992–93	Chōdendō Robo Tetsujin 28-go FX	Ikamu		
1992	Ashita e Free Kick (ja:あしたへフリーキック)	Jose Mascowitz		
1992	Tottoi	Guide		
1992	Tenchi Muyo! series	Kamidake, Hotsuma, Zumino Yoshiaki		
1992	Tsuyoshi Shikkari Shinasai	Keiko		
1992	Ellcia	Fank		
1992	Wolf Guy	Dr. Ishizuka		
1993	Dragon League	Celas		
1993	Sailor Moon R	Rubeus (Kurenai no Rubeusu)		
1993	Gakusaver	Satou	OAV	
1993	Ryūsei-ki gakuseibā (ja:''流星機ガクセイバー)			
1993	All Purpose Cultural Cat Girl Nuku Nuku	Tenchou	OAV; Ep. "Phase V"	
1993	Mega Man: Upon a Star	Rush	OAV	
1993	Rei Rei	Tanaka	OAV	
1994	Dirty Pair Flash	Baran		
1994	Compiler	Councilor D, Man		
1994	Red Baron	Chatatsu Momonari		
1994–95	New Cutie Honey	Hayami Akakabu		
1994	Iria: Zeiram the Animation	Zeiram, Nanbu		
1994	Tonde Burin	Jimmy Matsumoto, Mike		
1994	Samurai Shodown: The Motion Picture	Galford		
1994	Blue Seed	Fisherman 1, Person 1	Eps. 16, 17	
1994	Mahōjin Guru Guru	Geiru		
1994	Tekkaman Blade II	Hayato Kawakami		
1994	Captain Tsubasa J	Shingo Takasugi		
1995	Armitage III	Lowell Guntz		
1995	Jura Tripper	Tank		
1995	H2	Hironaga		
1995	Kakyuusei (First Loves)	Kakeshi	OAV	
1995	Nurse Angel Ririka SOS	Nakayama	Ep. 32	
1995	Mojacko	Pitekan		
1995	Golden Boy	Office worker		
1995	Bit the Cupid	Game		
1995	Fire Emblem	Barst	OAV	
1995–96	Idol Project	Ibble		
1996	GeGeGe no Kitarō	Mujina	Fourth series	
1996	Great Detective Conan	Genta Kojima, Wataru Takagi, others		
1996	Rurouni Kenshin	Gengo Onizaki, Tatewaki Shindou		
1996	After War Gundam X	Garod Ran		
1996	Burn-Up W	Terrorist B		
1996	Harley Spiny (ja:はりもぐハーリー)	Black Panda		
1996	Beast Wars: Transformers	Cheetor		
1996	Raideen the Superior	Shinobu Mushanokoji / Raideen Brad		
1996	Reideen the Superior	Kaidou Shinobu		
1996	Magical Project S	Kuuranger	Ep. 12	
1996–97	YAT Anshin! Uchū Ryokō	Daniel		
1996	Kindaichi Case Files Movie	Takizawa	Feature film	
1997	Slayers Try	Valgaav		
1997	Kindaichi Case Files	Jin'ya, Natsuoka		
1997	Ninpen Manmaru	Gankichi		
1997	Detatoko Princess	henchman A		
1997	Battle Athletes Victory	Terrorist A	Ep. 11	
1997	Kōgyō Aika Volley Boys	Taniguchi	OAV	
1997	Princess Rouge	Yuusuke Mizuki	OVA	
1998	Trigun	Man A		
1998	Initial D	Kenji		
1998	Flint the Time Detective	Nioja		
1998	Gasaraki	Symbol chief researcher		
1998	Popolocrois Monogatari	Marco, Don		
1998	One Piece: Defeat The Pirate Ganzak!	Roronoa Zoro	OVA	
1999	Crest of the Stars	Undertaker		
1999	Rurouni Kenshin: Trust & Betrayal	Takasugi Shinsaku		
1999	Power Stone	Jack		
1999	Arc the Lad	Alfred		
1999	Angel Links	Goryu, Ozka		
1999	Monster Farm	Suezō		
1999	Saiyuki	Sanzo	OAV	
1999-00	Great Teacher Onizuka	Eikichi Onizuka		
1999	My Neighbors the Yamadas	Kubo		
1999	Firefighter! Daigo of Fire Company M	Daigo	OVA	
1999	Excel Saga	Rikdo Koshi, Kosuke		
1999	Street Fighter Alpha: The Animation	Adon		
2000	Dinozaurs	Dino Stego		
2000	Hajime no Ippo series	Masaru Aoki		
2000	Legendary Gambler Tetsuya	Danchi		
2000	Shin Megami Tensei: DeviChil	Abaddon		
2001	Zoids: New Century Zero	Harry Champ		
2001–21	Shaman King	Tokagerō, Cebin Mendel		
2001	Najica Blitz Tactics	General		
2001	Hellsing	Leif		
2002	Special Curriculum: The Candidate for Goddess	Gareas Elidd		
2002	Cheeky Angel	Genzo Sōga		
2002	Naruto	Rain ninja	Ep. 21	
2002	GetBackers	Kait		
2002	Space Pirate Captain Herlock: The Endless Odyssey	Nu D, Professor Peak		
2003–24	One Piece	Bellamy, Vander Decken IX, Jango (replacing Kazuki Yao)		
2003	Cinderella Boy	Aramis		
2003	Rumiko Takahashi Anthology	Various characters		
2003	Moekan the Animation	Oyaji-san		
2004	Gokusen	Miyata		
2004	Jing, King of Bandits: Seventh Heaven	Maraschino	OVA	
2004	Sergeant Keroro	Nyorottle King; Pseudowettle King		
2004	Burst Angel	Anthony Wong		
2004–05	Monster	Gustav		
2005	Bleach	Ganju Shiba		
2005	Pandalian	Silver? Gold, Panno		
2005	Futari wa Pretty Cure Max Heart	Uraganos		
2005	Strawberry 100%	Rikiya Komiyama	Also OVAs	
2005	Doraemon	Teacher		
2005	Akagi	Yagi Keiji	Eps. 2-3	
2005	Hell Girl	Cab driver, Inagaki Tadashi		
2005	Naruto	Umino Iruka (Amegakure disguise)		
2006	Ayakashi: Samurai Horror Tales	Yomoshichi Satou		
2006	Mushiking: King of the Beetles	Bibi		
2006	Black Lagoon	Chaka		
2006	Tokkō	Kaoru Kunikida		
2006	Onegai My Melody: Kurukuru Shuffle!	Baku		
2007	Yes! PreCure 5	Bunbee	Also GoGo!	
2007–16	Naruto: Shippuden	Obito Uchiha		
2007	GeGeGe no Kitarō	Nezumi-Otoko, Shibaden	Fifth series	
2007	Blue Dragon	Fagīno		
2007	Onegai My Melody: Sukkiri	Baku		
2008	Zenryoku Usagi	Oyakata		
2008	Kyo Kara Maoh!	Ranjiru	Third series	
2008	Onegai My Melody: Kirara	Baku		
2008	Stitch!	Sparky		
2009-10	Metal Fight Beyblade	Kumasuke Kumade		
2009	Aoi Bungaku	Eriko	Eps. 1-4: "No Longer Human"	
2009	Kaidan Restaurant	Mecha-Kinjiro		
2010	Mobile Suit Gundam Unicorn	Alberto		
2010	Hana Kappa	Kurobaya cho hyoe		
2010	Nura: Rise of the Yokai Clan	Adashibara		
2010	Durarara!!	Horada		
2010	Shiki	Tatsumi		
2010–11	Pokémon Best Wishes!	Leon		
2010	Showa Monogatari	Ryō Takayanagi	Feature film and TV series	
2011	Rio: Rainbow Gate!	Orlin Dunhill		
2011	Beelzebub	Alaindelon		
2011	Toriko	Zonge		
2013	Hunter x Hunter	Knuckle Bine	2011 series	
2013	Duel Masters Victory V3	Katsudon		
2013	Bayonetta: Bloody Fate	Enzo		
2014	Wizard Barristers	Seseri Chōno		
2015	One Punch Man	Hammerhead		
2016	Digimon Universe: Appli Monsters	Den'emon Shinkai	Debut: ep. 16	
2016	JoJo's Bizarre Adventure: Diamond Is Unbreakable	Okuyasu Nijimura	Also Thus Spoke Kishibe Rohan	
2016	Space Patrol Luluco	Machspeed	Ep. 9	
2016	Kingsglaive: Final Fantasy XV	Pelna Khara		
2016	Drifters	Sundance Kid	Debut: ep. 3	
2017	Akiba's Trip: The Animation	Tsutomu Kuroi	Ep. 7	
2017	DC Super Heroes vs. Eagle Talon	Cyborg		
2018	Batman Ninja	Joker		
2018	Gurazeni	Roppa Itsuki	Debut: ep. 14	
2019	Sword Art Online: Alicization	Chudelkin		
2019	Mix	Eisuke Tachibana		
2019	Cop Craft	Biz O'naill		
2019	Obsolete	Fernando		
2020	Dorohedoro	Kaiman		
2021	Godzilla Singular Point	Gorō Ōtaki		
2021	Dragon Goes House-Hunting	Leprechaun		
2021–23	Record of Ragnarok	Zeus, Kondō Isami	ONA	
2021	The Dungeon of Black Company	Boss Goblin		
2021	Child of Kamiari Month	Ryūjin	Feature film	
2021	The Way of the Househusband	Teppoudaman	ONA (Ep. 6)	
2022	My Isekai Life	Proudwolf		
2022	Shine On! Bakumatsu Bad Boys!	Gyatarō		
2022	Cyberpunk: Edgerunners	Pilar	ONA	
2022	Detective Conan: The Culprit Hanzawa	Genta Kojima		
2022	Legend of Mana: The Teardrop Crystal	Niccolo		
2022	Urusei Yatsura	Cherry		
2023	Kuromi's Pretty Journey	Baku		
2023	Yakitori: Soldiers of Misfortune	Rimel	ONA	
2023	Pluto	Principal Ban	ONA	
2024	Shaman King: Flowers	Tokagerō		
2024	Grendizer U	Blacky		
2025	Ishura Season 2	Zigita Zogi the Thousandth		
2025	The Rose of Versailles	De Guéméné	Feature film	
2025	Batman Ninja vs. Yakuza League	Joker	Feature film	
2025	Gachiakuta	Bro		
2026	Fist of the North Star	Jagi		
2026	The Ghost in the Shell	Puppet		
2027	The Case Files of Biblia Bookstore	Shida		

=== Video games ===
List of voice performances in video games
Year	Series	Role	Notes	Source
1996	Riglord Saga 2	Rusty		
1996	Street Fighter Zero 2	Adon, Birdie, Sodom, Gen, Zangief		
1997	Street Fighter III: 2nd Impact	Ryu, Yang, Hugo		
1996	Soul Edge	Hwang Seong-gyeong, Mitsurugi Heishiro		
1997	Arunamu no Tsubasa	Shuren		
1997	Street Fighter EX	Zangief, Doctrine Dark		
1998	Startling Odyssey II Maryuu Sensou	Bullet Thunder		
1998	JoJo's Bizarre Adventure: Heritage For The Future	Cameo	Playstation version	
1998–present	Marvel vs. Capcom series	Zangief		
1998	Legend of Legaia	Vahn, Che Delilas		
1999	Soulcalibur	Hwang Sung Kyung		
1999	Crash Team Racing	Komodo Joe	Japanese dubbing	
1999	Love & Destroy	Egg		
2000	Popolo Crois Monogatari II	Gabo		
2000	Brave Saga 2	Saber Varion, Victorion, Galaxion		
2002	Shinobi	Young Hiruko		
2003	SNK vs. Capcom: SVC Chaos	Hugo		
2003	Kunochi	Onibi		
2004	Dragon Quest: The Journey of the Cursed King	Rhapthorne		
2007	Gegege no Kitaro: Youkai daiundoukai	Nzume Otoko		
2007	Super Robot Wars: Original Generations	Roa		
2007	Another Century's Episode 3: The Final	Gerald		
2010–present	Sonic the Hedgehog	Cubot		
2010	Kingdom Hearts Birth by Sleep	Experiment 211 (Sparky)		
2012	Street Fighter X Tekken	Hugo		
2012	Devil Summoner: Soul Hackers	Junnosuke Kitagawa / Lunch		
2012	Project X Zone	Ciseaux		
2013	JoJo's Bizarre Adventure: All Star Battle	Okuyasu Nijimura	Also R	
2014	Ultra Street Fighter IV	Hugo		
2014	Bayonetta	Enzo		
2014	Bayonetta 2	Enzo		
2015	JoJo's Bizarre Adventure: Eyes of Heaven	Okuyasu Nijimura		
2016	Mighty No. 9	Mighty No. 1 Pyrogen		
2016	Yakuza 6	Koji Masuzoe		
2018	Fighting EX Layer	Doctrine Dark		
2018	Identity V	Magician/Servais Le Roy		
2019	Dragon Marked For Death	Shinobi		
2019	Dragalia Lost	Arctos		
2020	Resident Evil 3	Brad Vickers		
2020	Final Fantasy VII Remake	Beck		
2021	JoJo's Bizarre Adventure: Last Survivor	Okuyasu Nijimura		
2021	SINoALICE	Joker		
2022	Bayonetta 3	Enzo		

=== Television drama ===
Year	Series	Role	Notes	Source
2016	Sanada Maru	Oyamada Shigemasa	Taiga drama	
2018	Half Blue Sky	Gorō Kidahara	Asadora	
2021	Reach Beyond the Blue Sky	Tamano Yofumi	Taiga drama	
2023	Ōoku: The Inner Chambers	Hotta Masayoshi		
2025	Unbound	Matsumuraya Yahei	Taiga drama	

=== Tokusatsu ===
List of voice performances in anime
Year	Series	Role	Notes	Source
2007	Kamen Rider Den-O	Armadillo Imagin	Ep. 43 - 44	
2008	Engine Sentai Go-onger	Savage Water Barbaric Machine Beast Bin Banki/Mahōbin Banki	Ep. 42	
2009	Kamen Rider Decade: Protect! The World of Televikun	TV Fly-kun	DVD	
2010	Tensou Sentai Goseiger	Ylabungora Alien Hidou of the Swift Runner	Ep. 6	
2011	Kaizoku Sentai Gokaiger	Nanonanoda	Ep. 6	
2012	Tokumei Sentai Go-Busters	Copyloid	Ep. 12	
2013	Zyuden Sentai Kyoryuger	Debo Kantokku	Ep. 40	
2014	Ressha Sentai ToQger	Soujiki Shadow	Ep. 14	
2016	Doubutsu Sentai Zyuohger	Gaburio	Ep. 5 - 6	
2018	Kaitou Sentai Lupinranger VS Keisatsu Sentai Patranger	Garatt Nargo	Ep. 1 - 2	
2019	Kishiryu Sentai Ryusoulger	Kishiryu DimeVolcano/Kishiryu SpinoThunder (Voiced by Ryota Takeuchi (Kishiryu MosaRex) (ep. 17, )	Eps. 11 - 13, 17 - 19, 31,	
2025	Kamen Rider Gavv	Magen	Ep. 1 - 2	

=== Drama CDs ===
List of performances in audio dramas
Series	Role	Notes	Source
Battle Girl Ai			
Double Call			
Musekinin Kids	Pirate 1		
Street Fighter EX	Doctrine Dark	Radio drama	
Tokimeki Memorial Saigo no Natsuyasumi	Hiroshi Toudou		

== Dubbing roles ==
=== Live-action ===
List of voice performances in overseas productions
Series	Role	Notes	Source
Jack Black
High Fidelity	Barry		
Shallow Hal	Hal Larson		
Nacho Libre	Ignacio/Nacho		
Be Kind Rewind	Jerry McLean		
Gulliver's Travels	Lemuel Gulliver		
The Big Year	Brad Harris		
Sex Tape	The owner of YouPorn		
The Brink	Alex Talbot		
The D Train	Daniel Gregory Landsman		
Goosebumps	R.L. Stine		
The Polka King	Jan Lewan		
Jumanji: Welcome to the Jungle	Professor Sheldon "Shelly" Oberon		
Goosebumps 2: Haunted Halloween	R.L. Stine		
Jumanji: The Next Level	Professor Sheldon "Shelly" Oberon		
Brain Games	Jack Black		
Borderlands	Claptrap		
Anaconda	Doug McCallister		
Seann William Scott
American Pie	Steve Stifler		
American Pie 2	Steve Stifler		
Evolution	Wayne Grey	2005 NTV edition	
American Wedding	Steve Stifler		
Southland Tales	Roland Taverner		
American Reunion	Steve Stifler		
Chris Rock
Lethal Weapon 4	Lee Butters		
Bad Company	Kevin Pope		
Bowling for Columbine	Chris Rock		
Fargo	Loy Cannon		
The Witches	Older Hero		
Spiral	Detective Zeke Banks		
Cuba Gooding, Jr.
Judgment Night	Mike Peterson		
The Fighting Temptations	Darrin Hill		
End Game	Alex Thomas		
Daddy Day Camp	Charlie Hinton		
The Butler	Carter Wilson	2016 BS Japan edition	
Charlie Chaplin
Making a Living	Swindler	2014 Star Channel edition	
Kid Auto Races at Venice	The Tramp	2014 Star Channel edition	
Caught in the Rain	Tipsy Hotel Guest	2014 Star Channel edition	
Laughing Gas	Dentist's Assistant	2014 Star Channel edition	
Others
17 Again	Ned Gold	Voice dub for Thomas Lennon	
24	Lynn McGill	Season 5; Voice dub for Sean Astin	
3 Idiots	Farhan Qureshi	Voice dub for R. Madhavan	
50 First Dates	Doug Whitmore	Voice dub for Sean Astin	
8 Simple Rules	C.J. Barnes	Season 2; Voice dub for David Spade	
All or Nothing	Rory	Voice dub for James Corden	
Alone in Love	Junpyo	Voice dub for Gong Hyung-jin	
American Crude	Bill	Voice dub for Rob Schneider	
American Pie Presents: The Naked Mile	Dwight Stifler	Voice dub for Steve Talley	
American Psycho	Paul Allen	Voice dub for Jared Leto	
Are We There Yet?	Nick Persons	Voice dub for Ice Cube	
Bachelor Party 2: The Last Temptation	Seth	Voice dub for Danny Jacobs	
Back to the Future	Goldie Wilson	Voice dub for Donald Fullilove; 2025 NTV edition	
Bad Boys II	Marcus Burnett	Voice dub for Martin Lawrence; 2006 TV Asahi edition	
Bad Genius	Lynn's Father	Voice dub for Thaneth Warakulnukroh	
Bad Santa	Marcus	Voice dub for Tony Cox	
Barbershop	J.D.	Voice dub for Anthony Anderson	
A Better Tomorrow	Sung Tse-Kit	Voice dub for Leslie Cheung	
A Better Tomorrow II	Sung Tse-Kit	Voice dub for Leslie Cheung	
Beverly Hills 90210	Mark Reese	Voice dub for Dalton James	
Big Cat Diary	Simon	Voice dub for Simon King	
Bill & Ted's Bogus Journey	Ted	Voice dub for Keanu Reeves; 1994 TV Tokyo edition	
Bill & Ted Face the Music	Bill S. Preston	Voice dub for Alex Winters	
The Blues Brothers	"Joliet" Jake Blues	Voice dub for John Belushi; 2011 Blu-Ray edition	
Breakin' All the Rules	Quincy Watson	Voice dub for Jamie Foxx	
Can't Hardly Wait	Kenny Fisher	Voice dub for Seth Green	
Chappie	Ninja	Voice dub for Ninja	
Charlie's Angels: Full Throttle	Seamus O'Grady	Voice dub for Justin Theroux	
Chef	Martin	Voice dub for John Leguizamo	
A Chinese Odyssey	Monkey / Joker	Voice dub for Stephen Chow	
Clueless	Travis Birkenstock	Voice dub for Breckin Meyer	
Collateral	Max Durocher	Voice dub for Jamie Foxx	
College Road Trip	Doug Greenhut	Voice dub for Donny Osmond	
Coming 2 America	Semmi	Voice dub for Arsenio Hall	
Cool Runnings	Junior Bevil	Voice dub for Rawle D. Lewis; 1998 NTV edition	
Cop Out	Detective Paul Hodges	Voice dub for Tracy Morgan	
CSI: New York		Season 2	
Dance with Me	Rafael Infante	Voice dub for Chayanne	
Dark Angel	Richard Gan		
Date Movie	Hitch	Voice dub for Tony Cox	
Doctor Who			
A Dog's Journey	Bailey, Molly, Big Dog, Max	Voice dub for Josh Gad	
Dollhouse	Zon		
Dr. Dolittle 2	Pepito	Voice dub for Jacob Vargas	
Dream Scenario	Brett	Voice dub for Tim Meadows	
Driven	Memo Moreno	Voice dub for Cristián de la Fuente; 2005 NTV edition	
Dune	Jamis	Voice dub for Babs Olusanmokun	
Dune: Part Two	Jamis	Voice dub for Babs Olusanmokun	
The Edge	Stephen	Voice dub for Harold Perrineau	
ER	Doctor Victor Clemente	Voice dub for John Leguizamo	
Evil Dead	Eric	Voice dub for Lou Taylor Pucci	
Exit	Thomas		
The Family Man	Cash	Voice dub for Don Cheadle	
The Fate of the Furious	Connor Rhodes	Voice dub for Kristofer Hivju	
Final Destination 3	Frankie Cheeks	Voice dub for Sam Easton	
First Sunday	Leejohn James Jacob Jackson	Voice dub for Tracy Morgan	
Fred Claus	Nicholas "Nick" Claus	Voice dub for Paul Giamatti	
Free Fire	Vernon	Voice dub for Sharlto Copley	
Friend	Jung-ho	Jung Woon Taek	
Full House	Steve		
Get on Up	James Brown	Voice dub for Chadwick Boseman	
Get Rich or Die Tryin'	Bama	Voice dub for Terrence Howard	
Ghostbusters	Louis Tully	Voice dub for Rick Moranis; 1999 DVD edition	
The Gilded Age	Ward McAllister	Voice dub for Nathan Lane	
Godzilla	Doctor Niko "Nick" Tatopoulos	Voice dub for Matthew Broderick	
Good Bye, Lenin!	Denis Domaschke	Voice dub for Florian Lukas	
Good Will Hunting	Morgan O'Mally	Voice dub for Casey Affleck	
Harry Potter and the Deathly Hallows – Part 1	Dobby	Voice dub for Toby Jones	
Hercules	Autolycus	Voice dub for Rufus Sewell	
Hideous Kinky	Bilal	Voice dub for Saïd Taghmaoui	
The Holdovers	Paul Hunham	Voice dub for Paul Giamatti	
Horrible Bosses 2	Dale Arbus	Voice dub for Charlie Day	
How to Train Your Dragon	Gobbler the Belch	Voice dub for Nick Frost	
The Hunt for Red October	Ronald Jones	Voice dub for Courtney B. Vance	
Illegally Yours		Voice dub for Jim Carrey	
In & Out	Jack	Voice dub for Shawn Hatosy	
Independence Day	Miguel Casse	Voice dub for James Duval	
Iron Man	James "Rhodey" Rhodes	Voice dub for Terrence Howard	
Iron Sky	James Washington	Voice dub for Christopher Kirby	
It's a Very Merry Muppet Christmas Movie	Pepe the King Prawn / Sal Minella		
James Dean: Race with Destiny	James Dean	Voice dub for Casper Van Dien	
Johnny English Strikes Again	Jeremy Bough	Voice dub for Ben Miller	
Joy Ride	Fuller	Voice dub for Steve Zahn; 2006 TV Tokyo edition	
Jurassic World: Fallen Kingdom	Mr. Eversoll	Voice dub for Toby Jones	
The Kingdom	Special Agent Ronald Fleury	Voice dub for Jamie Foxx	
The Last Castle	Corporal Aguilar	Voice dub for Clifton Collins Jr.	
LAX	Henry Engels	Voice dub for Frank John Hughes	
Liar Liar	Fletcher Reede	Voice dub for Jim Carrey	
Little House on the Prairie	Mr. Edwards	Voice dub for Victor French; 2019 NHK BS4K edition	
Lock, Stock and Two Smoking Barrels	Soap	Voice dub for Dexter Fletcher	
Lost Boys: The Tribe	Sam Emerson	Voice dub for Corey Haim	
The Man from Toronto	Teddy	Voice dub for Kevin Hart	
Mean Spirit	Simon	2003 film	
Meet the Blacks	Carl Black	Voice dub for Mike Epps	
Meet the Spartans	Leonidas	Voice dub for Sean Maguire	
Mike and Dave Need Wedding Dates	Michael "Mike" Stangle	Voice dub for Adam DeVine	
Miss Congeniality 2: Armed and Fabulous	Jeff Foreman	Voice dub for Enrique Murciano	
The Muppets	Pepe the King Prawn / Miss Poogy		
Muppet Treasure Island	Beaker / Spa'am / Black Dog		
Muppets from Space	Pepe the King Prawn / Sal Minella		
Muppets Tonight	Pepe the King Prawn / Sal Minella		
The Muppets' Wizard of Oz	Pepe the King Prawn / Sal Minella / Floyd Pepper		
My Big Fat Greek Life	Nick Portokalos	Voice dub for Louis Mandylor	
Nash Bridges	J.J.	Voice dub for Steve Berra	
Night at the Museum: Battle of the Smithsonian	Brandon	Voice dub for Jonah Hill	
Notorious	Sean Combs / Puff Daddy	Voice dub for Derek Luke	
Once Bitten	Mark Kendall	Voice dub for Jim Carrey	
Once in a Summer	Leader		
Peaceful	Dr. Eddé		
Predators	Stans	Voice dub for Walton Goggins	
Prodigal Son	Dr. Martin Whitly	Voice dub for Michael Sheen	
Punisher: War Zone	James "Looney Bin Jim" Russotti	Voice dub for Doug Hutchison	
Quantum of Solace	Gregg Beam	Voice dub for David Harbour	
Rampage	Brett Wyden	Voice dub for Jake Lacy	
Reality Bites	Sammy Gray	Voice dub for Steve Zahn	
Renegade Justice	Armand Tucker	Voice dub for Eddie Griffin	
Resident Evil: Apocalypse	Lloyd Jefferson "L.J." Wade	Voice dub for Mike Epps	
Roboshark	Rick	Voice dub for Matt Rippy	
Rogue Trader	Danny Argyropoulos	Voice dub for Lee Ross	
Roman Holiday	Irving Radovich	Voice dub for Eddie Albert; New Era Movies edition	
Sanctum	George	Voice dub for Daniel Wyllie	
A Scanner Darkly	James Barris	Voice dub for Robert Downey Jr.	
School of Rock	Theo	Voice dub for Adam Pascal	
Shan	Joe Starrett	Voice dub for Van Heflin	
Shaolin Soccer	Light Weight Vest	Voice dub for Lam Chi-chung	
Simon Sez	Nick Miranda	Voice dub for Dane Cook	
Snakes on a Plane	Troy	Voice dub for Kenan Thompson	
Snow White and the Huntsman	Coll	Voice dub for Toby Jones	
Sound of Freedom	Vampiro	Voice dub for Bill Camp	
Stand by Me	Richard "Eyeball" Chambers	Voice dub for Bradley Gregg	
The Stepford Wives	Walter Kresby	Voice dub for Matthew Broderick	
The Strain	Jim Kent	Voice dub for Sean Astin	
Strays	Gus	Voice dub for Josh Gad	
Studio DC: Almost Live	Pepe the King Prawn / Floyd Pepper		
S.W.A.T.	Brian Gamble	Voice dub for Jeremy Renner	
Swing Kids	Peter Müller	Voice dub for Robert Sean Leonard	
There Goes My Baby	Stick	Voice dub for Rick Schroder	
Timeless	Rufus Carlin	Voice dub for Malcolm Barrett	
Top Gun	Lt. (j.g.) Nick "Goose" Bradshaw	Voice dub for Anthony Edwards; 2005 NTV edition	
Transcendence	Martin	Voice dub for Clifton Collins Jr.	
Transformers	Glen Whitmann	Voice dub for Anthony Anderson	
Transformers: Rise of the Beasts	Cheetor	Voice dub for Tongayi Chirisa	
True Romance	Floyd	Voice dub for Brad Pitt	
Ugly Betty	Ben	Season 2	
Unleashed	Lefty	Voice dub for Dylan Brown	
Valley of the Boom	Michael Fenne	Voice dub for Steve Zahn	
Van Helsing	Friar Carl	Voice dub for David Wenham	
Victorious	Shikou Itsou		
The Villain	Nico		
V.I.P.	Sean Becker		
Voces inocentes	Ancha		
The Wedding Ringer	Jimmy Callahan	Voice dub for Kevin Hart	
Who's Your Caddy?	Christopher "C-Note" Hawkins	Voice dub for Big Boi	
The Wraith	Billy Hankins	1992 TV Asahi edition	
Y Tu Mamá También	Julio Zapata	Voice dub for Gael García Bernal	
You're Next	Doo		

=== Animation ===
Series	Role	Notes	Source
Cinderella II: Dreams Come True	The Baker		
DC League of Super-Pets	Ace the Bat-Hound		
Delgo	Filo		
Elemental	Harold		
Gamoverse	Gobbles		
Happy Feet Two	Raul		
Helluva Boss	Blitzo		
Love, Death & Robots	Sergeant Morris		
Rango	Waffles		
Space Jam: A New Legacy	Daffy Duck		
The Tale of Despereaux	Despereaux Tilling		
Up	Gamma the Bulldog		
Waking Life	The Protagonist		
Zootopia 2	Antony Snootley		
Ed, Edd n Eddy	Eddy		
Ed, Edd n Eddy's Big Picture Show	Eddy		
Felix the Cat	Professor		
The Garfield Show	Garfield		
Happy Feet	Raul		
Kung Fu Panda	Zen		
Looney Tunes	Daffy Duck		
New Looney Tunes	Daffy Duck, Impkin		
Monster House	Officer Lester		
Scaredy Squirrel	Scaredy		
Shrek 2	Humphries		
The Smurfs	Gutsy Smurf		
The Smurfs 2	Gutsy Smurf		
Space Jam	Daffy Duck		
Stuart Little 3: Call of the Wild	Reeko		
The Tom and Jerry Show	Tom		
Where on Earth Is Carmen Sandiego?	Zach		
X-Men: The Animated Series	Iceman		

=== Video games ===
Series	Role	Notes	Source
Spider-Man 2	Ganke Lee		
