= List of Akagi chapters =

First volume of Akagi, released in Japan by Takeshobo on April 24, 1992

The chapters of the Japanese manga series Akagi: Yami ni Oritatta Tensai are written and illustrated by Nobuyuki Fukumoto. They were serialized in Takeshobo's magazine Kindai Mahjong between June 1, 1991, and February 1, 2018. They were later compiled by Takeshobo into 36 tankōbon collected volumes and released between April 24, 1992, and June 27, 2018.

Two spin-off manga written and illustrated by Keiichirō Hara and focused on the main character's rival, Iwao Washizu, were also released. Washizu: Enma no Tōhai (ワシズ－閻魔の闘牌－, lit. 'Washizu: Lord of Mahjong Hell') was serialized in Monthly Kindai Mahjong Original starting on June 28, 2008. The series spawned eight volumes released between February 17, 2009, and January 26, 2013. On November 8, 2012, Monthly Kindai Mahjong Original published the first chapter of Washizu: Tenka Sōsei Tōhairoku (ワシズ 天下創世闘牌録, lit. 'Washizu: The Mahjong That Ruled a Nation'), and it moved to the magazine Kindai Manga in May 2014. The series, that explores the past of Washizu, concluded as the fourth volume was released on May 15, 2015.

== Volume list ==
=== Akagi: Yami ni Oritatta Tensai ===
| No. | Title | Japanese release date | Japanese ISBN |
|---|---|---|---|
| 1 | Shin'iki no Tōhai (Holy Mahjong (神域の闘牌)) | April 24, 1992 | 978-4-88475-574-4 |
1. "Change" (変化, Henka); 2. "Deal" (取引, Torihiki); 3. "Good Luck" (強運, Kyōun); 4. "Insight" (洞察, Dōsatsu); 5. "Awakening" (覚醒, Kakusei); 6. "Severity" (感度, Kando); 7. "Gap" (間隙, Kangeki); 8. "Talent" (資質, Shishitsu); 9. "Demon" (魔物, Mamono)
| 2 | Itan no Tōhai (Heretical Mahjong (異端の闘牌)) | December 9, 1992 | 978-4-88475-620-8 |
10. "Scheme" (策略, Sakuryaku); 11. "Heresy" (異端, Itan); 12. "Collapse" (崩壊, Hōkai); 13. "Madness" (狂気, Kyōki); 14. "Threat" (脅迫, Kyōhaku); 15. "Outlaw" (無頼, Burai); 16. "Retaliation" (報復, Hōfuku); 17. "Absence" (不在, Fuzai); 18. "Counterattack" (反撃, Hangeki)
| 3 | Kyōsō no Tōhai (Maniacal Mahjong (狂躁の闘牌)) | September 29, 1993 | 978-4-88475-673-4 |
19. "Psychology" (心理, Shinri); 20. "One Suit Out" (絶一門, Zetsu ichimon); 21. "Predicament" (窮地, Kyūchi); 22. "Dangerous Tile" (暴牌, Bōhai); 23. "Picaresque" (悪漢, Pikaro); 24. "Live Tile" (生牌, Shonpai); 25. "Hot Chase" (猛追, Mōtsui); 26. "Victory" (勝利, Shōri); 27. "Unavaricious" (無欲, Muyoku)
| 4 | Tetsuri no Tōhai (Philosophical Mahjong (哲理の闘牌)) | June 27, 1994 | 978-4-88475-723-6 |
28. "Omen" (前兆, Zenchō); 29. "Small Change" (小銭, Kozeni); 30. "Authenticity" (真贋, Shingan); 31. ""Different"" (「別」, "Betsu"); 32. "Wickedness" (悪業, Akugyō); 33. "Life Tile" (災厄, Saiyaku); 34. "Preliminary Tremor" (予震, Yoshin); 35. "Prediction" (予言, Yogen); 36. "Swindling" (詐術, Sajutsu)
| 5 | Kyōran no Tōhai (Tremulous Mahjong (狂瀾の闘牌)) | April 17, 1995 | 978-4-88475-799-1 |
37. "Canyon" (渓谷, Keikoku); 38. "Temporary" (一時, Ichiji); 39. "Amateur" (素人, Shirōto); 40. "Groundwork" (布石, Fuseki); 41. "High Waves" (高波, Takanami); 42. "Suppression" (封殺, Fūsatsu); 43. "Naught" (絶無, Zetsumu); 44. "Coincidence" (偶機, Gūki); 45. "Capacity" (容量, Yōryō)
| 6 | Gyakuri no Tōhai (Paradoxical Mahjong (逆理の闘牌)) | January 27, 1996 | 978-4-8124-5005-5 |
46. "Crossroads" (岐路, Kiro); 47. "Magic" (魔法, Mahō); 48. "Genuine" (本物, Honmono); 49. "Storm" (風雷, Fūrai); 50. "Compensation" (代償, Daishō); 51. "Purity" (純度, Jundo); 52. "Livelihood" (生業, Seigyō); 53. "Money On Hand" (有り金, Arigane); 54. "Cooperation" (連携, Renkei)
| 7 | Gōka no Tōhai (Hellfire Mahjong (業火の闘牌)) | July 10, 1997 | 978-4-8124-5138-0 |
55. "Passing" (通し, Tōshi); 56. "Report" (申告, Shinkoku); 57. "Mysterious Death" (怪死, Kaishi); 58. "Firepower" (火力, Karyoku); 59. "Violence" (暴挙, Bōgyo); 60. "Deviation" (逸脱, Itsudatsu); 61. "Heart of Hearts" (心中, Shinjū); 62. "Mud" (泥土, Deido); 63. "Vain Death" (犬死, Inujini)
| 8 | Rasetsu no Tōhai (Rakshasa Mahjong (羅刹の闘牌)) | April 27, 1998 | 978-4-8124-5193-9 |
64. "Serpent" (大蛇, Daija); 65. "Opportunity" (時機, Jiki); 66. "Audience" (謁見, Ekken); 67. "Blood" (血液, Ketsueki); 68. "Assassin" (刺客, Shikaku); 69. "Life Funds" (命銭, Meisen); 70. "Opening Round" (開局, Kaikyoku); 71. "Insertion" (差込, Sashikomi); 72. "Interval" (間合, Maai)
| 9 | Kishin no Tōhai (Ungodly Mahjong (鬼神の闘牌)) | February 27, 1999 | 978-4-8124-5281-3 |
73. "Genius" (異才, Isai); 74. "Blood Draw" (採血, Saiketsu); 75. "Curse" (呪縛, Jubaku); 76. "Evasion" (回避, Kaihi); 77. "Restraint" (抑制, Yokusei); 78. "Camouflage" (擬装, Gisō); 79. "Odds of Victory" (勝機, Shōki); 80. "On the Brink" (寸前, Sunzen); 81. "Rejection" (拒否, Kyohi)
| 10 | Nyūshin no Tōhai (Superhuman Mahjong (入神の闘牌)) | November 27, 1999 | 978-4-8124-5333-9 |
82. "Hope" (希望, Kibō); 83. "Folly" (愚行, Gukō); 84. "Devil" (悪鬼, Akki); 85. "Fear" (恐れ, Osore); 86. "Fate" (命運, Meiun); 87. "Illusion" (幻想, Gensō); 88. "Huge Difference" (圧差, Assa); 89. "Declaration" (宣言, Sengen); 90. "Explosion" (爆発, Bakuhatsu)
| 11 | Katsugan no Tōhai (Keen Mahjong (活眼の闘牌)) | August 27, 2001 | 978-4-8124-5544-9 |
91. "Defrosting" (解凍, Kaitō); 92. "Operation" (操作, Sōsa); 93. "At Will" (自在, Jizai); 94. "Premonition" (予感, Yokan); 95. "Lightning" (雷光, Raikō); 96. "Monstrous Luck" (剛運, Gōun); 97. "Postponement" (猶予, Yōyo); 98. "Greed" (強欲, Gōyoku); 99. "Ghouls" (魔物, Mamono)
| 12 | Yasha no Tōhai (Yaksha Mahjong (夜叉の闘牌)) | January 26, 2001 | 978-4-8124-5616-3 |
100. "Summit" (嶺上, Rinshan); 101. "Spectre" (物の怪, Mononoke); 102. "Forfeit" (喪失, Sōshitsu); 103. "Nothingness" (水泡, Suihō); 104. "Covetousness" (垂涎, Suizen); 105. "Rat" (鼠, Nezumi); 106. "Off Course" (迷走, Meisō); 107. "Robbery" (荒稼ぎ, Arakasegi)
| 13 | Shima no Tōhai (Demonic Mahjong (死魔の闘牌)) | June 27, 2002 | 978-4-8124-5670-5 |
108. "Revocation" (破棄, Haki); 109. "Addition" (追加, Tsuika); 110. "Seam" (綻び, Hokorobi); 111. "Pulsation" (鼓動, Kodō); 112. "Affinity" (寵愛, Chōai); 113. "Fateful Tile" (綾牌, Ayahai); 114. "Desperation" (死守, Shishu); 115. "Revelation" (天啓, Tenkei); 116. "Moonlight" (月光, Gekkō)
| 14 | Makutsu no Tōhai (Red-Light Mahjong (魔窟の闘牌)) | March 27, 2003 | 978-4-8124-5792-4 |
117. "Unearthly" (妖気, Yōki); 118. "Demon Pit" (魔孔, Makō); 119. "One Tile" (一牌, Ippai); 120. "Messenger" (伝令, Denrei); 121. "Secret Plan" (秘策, Hisaku); 122. "Oracle" (神託, Shintaku); 123. "Reaper" (死神, Shinigami); 124. "Source" (種, Tane); 125. "Exhaustion" (消耗, Shōmō)
| 15 | Nenten no Tōhai (Twisting Mahjong (捻転の闘牌)) | February 27, 2004 | 978-4-8124-5917-1 |
126. "Struggle" (死闘, Shitō); 127. "Pressing Force" (押圧, Ōatsu); 128. "Confinement" (足止め, Ashidome); 129. "Sudden" (急遽, Kyūkyo); 130. "Mockery" (翻弄, Honrō); 131. "Trembling" (振り, Furi); 132. "Rock Plate" (岩板, Ganban); 133. "Continuance" (続行, Zokkō); 134. "Insubordination" (不逞, Futei)
| 16 | Jaki no Tōhai (Malicious Mahjong (邪気の闘牌)) | September 27, 2004 | 978-4-8124-6022-1 |
135. "Venomous Snake" (毒蛇, Dokuhebi); 136. "Failure" (破綻, Hatan); 137. "Chance" (好機, Kōki); 138. "Abhorrent" (醜悪, Shūaku); 139. "Escape" (遁走, Tonsō); 140. "Importance" (力点, Rikiten); 141. "Wedge" (楔, Kusabi); 142. "Attribute" (習性, Shūsei)
| 17 | Gekirō no Tōhai (Tremulous Mahjong (激浪の闘牌)) | June 7, 2005 | 978-4-8124-6187-7 |
143. "First Dealer" (起家, Chīcha); 144. "Malicious" (邪気, Jaki); 145. "Mistake" (錯誤, Sakugo); 146. "Backfire" (裏目, Urame); 147. "Thrice" (三度, Sando); 148. "Confidence" (確信, Kakushin); 149. "Momentum" (熱量, Netsuryō); 150. "Monstrous" (怪物, Kaibutsu); 151. "Honor Tiles" (字牌, Jihai)
| 18 | Gyakusetsu no Tōhai (Meandering Mahjong (曲折の闘牌)) | February 27, 2006 | 978-4-8124-6436-6 |
152. "Limit" (極限, Kyokugen); 153. "Weak Point" (急所, Kyūbasho); 154. "Automatic" (自動, Jidō); 155. "Abnormality" (異常, Ijō); 156. "Flash" (閃光, Senkō); 157. "Divine Protection" (加護, Kago); 158. "Sandstorm" (砂塵, Sajin); 159. "Advice" (進言, Shingen); 160. "Choice" (選択, Sentaku)
| 19 | Shingai no Tōhai (Terror Mahjong (震駭の闘牌)) | January 27, 2007 | 978-4-8124-6549-3 |
161. "Divine Power" (神通力, Jintsūriki); 162. "Darkness" (闇, Yami); 163. "Hundred Thousand" (十万, Jūman); 164. "Continuity" (連続, Renzoku); 165. "Great Difference" (雲泥, Undei); 166. "Orphans" (国士, Kokushi); 167. "Dominion" (独壇場, Dokudanjō); 168. "Trap Tile" (粘牌, Nenpai)
| 20 | Akuryō no Tōhai (Diabolical Mahjong (悪霊の闘牌)) | July 17, 2007 | 978-4-8124-6711-4 |
169. "Paper-Thin" (張子, Hariko); 170. "Delusion" (妄想, Mōsō); 171. "No Fight" (不戦, Fusen); 172. "Cheap Hand" (安目, Yasume); 173. "Folding" (降り, Furi); 174. "Stimulation" (呼び水, Yobimizu); 175. "Dragon Tiles" (三元牌, Sangenpai); 176. "Main Course" (本流, Honryū); 177. "Strike" (一撃, Ichigeki)
| 21 | Kesshin no Tōhai (Do-or-Die Mahjong (決死の闘牌)) | April 26, 2008 | 978-4-8124-6820-3 |
178. "Multitude" (数多, Sūta); 179. "Rotation" (旋回, Senkai); 180. "Annihilation" (消滅, Shōmetsu); 181. "Direct Hit" (直撃, Chokugeki); 182. "Fissure" (亀裂, Kiretsu); 183. "Retreat" (撤退, Tettai); 184. "Divine Wind" (神風, Kamikaze); 185. "Up In Flames" (炎上, Enjō)
| 22 | Makyō no Tōhai (Haunted Mahjong (魔境の闘牌)) | February 17, 2009 | 978-4-8124-7035-0 |
186. "Ground Level" (地平, Chihei); 187. "Starvation" (枯渇, Kokatsu); 188. "Betrayal" (寝返り, Negaeri); 189. "Self-Salvation" (自力, Jiriki); 190. "Flight" (飛翔, Hishō); 191. "Tide" (潮流, Chōryū); 192. "Adhesiveness" (粘力, Nenriki); 193. "Last Drop" (一滴, Itteki); 194. "Blood Loss" (失血, Shikketsu)
| 23 | Kokki no Tōhai (Self-Controlled Mahjong (克己の闘牌)) | October 5, 2009 | 978-4-8124-7165-4 |
195. "Pursuit" (追撃, Tsuigeki); 196. "Ready" (立直, Rīchi); 197. "Fallacy" (迷妄, Meimō); 198. "Absorption" (吸引, Kyūin); 199. "Enterprise" (偉業, Igyō); 200. "Wasteland" (荒野, Kōya); 201. "Wave of Insight" (念波, Nenpa); 202. "Suspension Bridge" (吊り橋, Tsuribanashi); 203. "Resolution" (英断, Eidan)
| 24 | Kyūten no Tōhai (Turnaround Mahjong (急転の闘牌)) | June 11, 2010 | 978-4-8124-7287-3 |
204. "High Speed" (高速, Kōsoku); 205. "Hindrance" (邪魔, Jama); 206. "Flaw" (欠点, Ketten); 207. "Grave Ditch" (墓穴, Boketsu); 208. "Musk" (麝香, Jakō); 209. "Trifling" (些少, Sashō); 210. "Underworld" (黄泉, Yomi); 211. "Apparitions" (亡霊, Bōrei); 212. "King" (王, Ō)
| 25 | Shichi no Tōhai (Inescapable Mahjong (死地の闘牌)) | July 27, 2011 | 978-4-8124-7640-6 |
213. "Emotion" (感情, Kanjō); 214. "Nonsense" (戯言, Gigen); 215. "Trash Hand" (屑手, Kuzute); 216. "Natural" (自然, Shizen); 217. "Contribution" (貢献, Kōken); 218. "Two Tiles" (二枚, Nimai); 219. "Cheap" (安直, Anchoku); 220. "Opposites" (真逆, Magyaku); 221. "Total Change" (一変, Ippen)
| 26 | Kyōnetsu no Tōhai (Enthusiastic Mahjong (狂熱の闘牌)) | July 17, 2012 | 978-4-8124-7931-5 |
222. "Likely Winner" (本命, Honmei); 223. "Self Restraint" (自制, Jisei); 224. "Explosives" (爆薬, Bakuyaku); 225. "Extreme Luck" (超運, Chōun); 226. "Character Tiles" (萬子, Manzu); 227. "Bonfire" (篝火, Kagaribi); 228. "Gambler" (博徒, Bakuto); 229. "Unexpected" (不測, Fusoku); 230. "Nightmare" (悪夢, Akumu)
| 27 | Anmo no Tōhai (Dark-Draw Mahjong (闇漠の闘牌)) | July 17, 2013 | 978-4-8124-8344-2 |
231. "Exposure" (暴露, Bakuro); 232. "Opening" (開口, Kaikō); 233. "Dulled" (鈍, Namakura); 234. "Gambling Senses" (博感, Bakukan); 235. "Gambling Luck" (博運, Baku'un); 236. "Fixation" (凝視, Gyōshi); 237. "Gambling Heart" (博心, Bakushin); 238. "Misfire" (不発, Fuhatsu); 239. "Fierce Gambling" (鬼博打, Kibakuchi)
| 28 | Shōmetsu no Tōhai (Life-or-Death Mahjong (生滅の闘牌)) | December 10, 2013 | 978-4-8124-8469-2 |
240. "Seafloor" (海底, Haitei); 241. "Instant" (刹那, Setsuna); 242. "Safe Tile" (安牌, Anpai); 243. "Patience" (辛抱, Shinbō); 244. "Avidya" (無明, Mumyō); 245. "White Flag" (白旗, Shirahata); 246. "Humiliation" (屈辱, Kutsujoku); 247. "Hell" (地獄, Jigoku)
| 29 | Higa no Tōhai (Two-Sided Mahjong (彼我の闘牌)) | March 2, 2015 | 978-4-8019-5202-7 |
248. "Punishment" (成敗, Seibai); 249. "Ghosts" (亡者, Mōja); 250. "Rebellion" (反乱, Hanran); 251. "Lone Soldier" (一騎, Ikki); 252. "Extermination" (殲滅, Senmetsu); 253. "Yama" (閻魔, Enma); 254. "Authority" (威光, Ikō); 255. "Transient World" (現世, Gensei)
| 30 | Kaiten no Tōhai (World-Changing Mahjong (回天の闘牌)) | August 1, 2015 | 978-4-8019-5335-2 |
256. "Exit" (出口, Deguchi); 257. "Miserable Sight" (惨状, Sanjō); 258. "Revival" (復活, Fukkatsu); 259. "Dim" (朧, Oboro); 260. "Starting Hands" (配牌, Haipai); 261. "Resemblance" (類似, Ruiji); 262. "Linkage" (連動, Rendō); 263. "Blockage" (窒塞, Chissoku)
| 31 | Funnu no Tōhai (Raging Mahjong (憤怒の闘牌)) | May 16, 2016 | 978-4-8019-5521-9 |
264. "Turbidity" (混濁, Kondaku); 265. "Assembling" (参集, Sanshū); 266. "Disclosure" (露呈, Rotei); 267. "Heavenly Thread" (天糸, Tegusu); 268. "Logic" (道理, Dōri); 269. "Delight" (歓喜, Kanki); 270. "Blow" (一打, Ichida); 271. "Full Flush" (清一, Chinitsu)
| 32 | Airo no Tōhai (Bottleneck Mahjong (隘路の闘牌)) | September 26, 2016 | 978-4-8019-5636-0 |
272. "Reason" (理由, Riyū); 273. "Emptiness" (空, Kara); 274. "Privilege" (権利, Kenri); 275. "Crack" (罅, Hibi); 276. "Business" (営為, Eii); 277. "Remains" (名残, Nagori); 278. "Firebird" (鳳凰, Hōō); 279. "Defeat" (不覚, Fukaku)
| 33 | Yōi no Tōhai (Mysterious Mahjong (妖異の闘牌)) | December 15, 2016 | 978-4-8019-5704-6 |
280. "Divine Trap" (神罠, Shinbin); 281. "Cherished Desire" (本願, Hongan); 282. "Phoenix" (不死鳥, Fushichō); 283. "War Fortunes" (武運, Buun); 284. "Real Strength" (地力, Jiriki); 285. "Second Best" (次善, Jizen); 286. "Blockade" (封鎖, Fūsa)
| 34 | Rutsubo no Tōhai (Crucible Mahjong (坩堝の闘牌)) | April 15, 2017 | 978-4-8019-5908-8 |
287. "Substitute" (代理, Dairi); 288. "Crucible" (坩堝, Rutsubo); 289. "Heart" (心臓, Shinzō); 290. "Freedom" (自由, Jiyū); 291. "Taking Effect" (開通, Kaitsū); 292. "Despair" (絶望, Zetsubō); 293. "Execution" (執行, Shikkō)
| 35 | Dōkoku no Tōhai (Lamenting Mahjong (慟哭の闘牌)) | November 1, 2017 | 978-4-8019-6094-7 |
294. "Hazy" (朦朧, Mōrō); 295. "Measures" (措置, Sochi); 296. "Climax" (絶頂, Zecchō); 297. "Skull" (髑髏, Dokuro); 298. "Deterioration" (劣化, Rekka); 299. "Incomplete" (未完, Mikan); 300. "Calamity" (災難, Sainan)
| 36 | Chōbi no Tōhai (Final Mahjong (掉尾の闘牌)) | June 27, 2018 | 978-4-8019-6308-5 |
301. "Gambling Den" (盆, Bon); 302. "Stupidity" (盆暗, Bonkura); 303. "Recovery" (回収, Kaishū); 304. "Coincidence" (偶然, Gūzen); 305. "Train Stopping" (停車, Teisha); 306. "History" (歴史, Rekishi)

=== Washizu: Enma no Tōhai ===
| No. | Release date | ISBN |
|---|---|---|
| 1 | February 17, 2009 | 978-4-8124-7043-5 |
1. "The Beginning of Darkness" (闇の始動, Yami no Shidō); 2. "Ruler of the Table" (卓の支配者, Taku no Shihaisha); 3. "Betrayal" (裏切り, Uragiri); 4. "Eagle VS Falcon 1" (ワシVSハヤブサ①, Washi VS Hayabusa 1); 5. "Eagle VS Falcon 2" (ワシVSハヤブサ②, Washi VS Hayabusa 2); 6. "Eagle VS Falcon 3" (ワシVSハヤブサ③, Washi VS Hayabusa 3); 7. "Eagle VS Weasel" (ワシVSイタチ, Washi VS Itachi); 8. "Eagle VS Dragon 1" (ワシVSリュウ①, Washi VS Ryū 1)
| 2 | August 7, 2009 | 978-4-8124-7141-8 |
9. "Eagle VS Dragon 2" (ワシVSリュウ②, Washi VS Ryū 2); 10. "Eagle VS Dragon 3" (ワシVSリュウ③, Washi VS Ryū 3); 11. "The Curious Study of Dr. Mera" (目羅博士の不思議な研究, Mera-hakase no Fushigi na Kenkyū); 12. "Unfreeze" (解凍, Kaitō); 13. "Desirable Reward" (欲望報酬, Yokubō Hōshū)
| 3 | January 27, 2010 | 978-4-8124-7229-3 |
14. "The Man Who Controls the Future" (未来を統べる者, Mirai o Suberu Mono); 15. "Pirate Tide 1" (海賊潮流①, Kaizoku Chōryū 1); 16. "Pirate Tide 2" (海賊潮流②, Kaizoku Chōryū 2); 17. "Pirate Tide 3" (海賊潮流③, Kaizoku Chōryū 3); 18. "Pirate Tide 4" (海賊潮流④, Kaizoku Chōryū 4); 19. "Pirate Tide 5" (海賊潮流⑤, Kaizoku Chōryū 5)
| 4 | July 17, 2010 | 978-4-8124-7417-4 |
20. "Pirate Tide 6" (海賊潮流⑥, Kaizoku Chōryū 6); 21. "Pirate Tide 7" (海賊潮流⑦, Kaizoku Chōryū 7); 22. "Pirate Tide 8" (海賊潮流⑧, Kaizoku Chōryū 8); 23. "Pirate Tide 9" (海賊潮流⑨, Kaizoku Chōryū 9); 24. "The Creator" (創造主, Sōzōshu); 25. "That's the Man With the Big Arm!" (その男、豪腕につき！, Sono Otoko, Gōwan ni Tsuki!)
| 5 | February 26, 2011 | 978-4-8124-7515-7 |
26. "The Tile Has Been Discarded" (牌は捨てられた, Hai Wa Suterareta); 27. "The Glittering Frog 1" (煌めきの蛙①, Kirameki no Kaeru 1); 28. "The Glittering Frog 2" (煌めきの蛙②, Kirameki no Kaeru 2); 29. "The Glittering Frog 3" (煌めきの蛙③, Kirameki no Kaeru 3); 30. "The Glittering Frog 4" (煌めきの蛙④, Kirameki no Kaeru 4); 31. "The Glittering Frog 5" (煌めきの蛙⑤, Kirameki no Kaeru 5)
| 6 | July 16, 2011 | 978-4-8124-7626-0 |
32. "Seal" (封印, Fūin); 33. "Mummy Baron 1" (木乃伊男爵①, Miira Danshaku 1); 34. "Mummy Baron 2" (木乃伊男爵②, Miira Danshaku 2); 35. "The Grey Morning Experience 1" (黎明エクスペリエンス①, Reimei Ekusuperiensu 1); 36. "The Grey Morning Experience 2" (黎明エクスペリエンス②, Reimei Ekusuperiensu 2); 37. "The Grey Morning Experience 3" (黎明エクスペリエンス③, Reimei Ekusuperiensu 3); 38. "The Grey Morning Experience 4" (黎明エクスペリエンス④, Reimei Ekusuperiensu 4)
| 7 | May 26, 2012 | 978-4-8124-7777-9 |
39. "The Grey Morning Experience 5" (黎明エクスペリエンス⑤, Reimei Ekusuperiensu 5); 40. "The Grey Morning Experience 6" (黎明エクスペリエンス⑥, Reimei Ekusuperiensu 6); 41. "The Grey Morning Experience 7" (黎明エクスペリエンス⑦, Reimei Ekusuperiensu 7); 42. "The Grey Morning Experience 8" (黎明エクスペリエンス⑧, Reimei Ekusuperiensu 8); 43. "Mahjong Train Murder Case 1" (麻雀列車殺人事件①, Mājan Ressha Satsujinjiken 1); 44. "Mahjong Train Murder Case 2" (麻雀列車殺人事件②, Mājan Ressha Satsujinjiken 1); 45. "Prison Block Six 1" (監獄六区①, Kangoku Rokku 1)
| 8 | January 26, 2013 | 978-4-8124-8094-6 |
46. "Prison Block Six 2" (監獄六区②, Kangoku Rokku 2); 47. "Prison Block Six 3" (監獄六区③, Kangoku Rokku 3); 48. "Prison Block Six 4" (監獄六区④, Kangoku Rokku 4); 49. "Prison Block Six 5" (監獄六区⑤, Kangoku Rokku 5); 50. "Prison Block Six 6" (監獄六区⑥, Kangoku Rokku 6); 51. "Prison Block Six 7" (監獄六区⑦, Kangoku Rokku 7); 52. "Prison Block Six 8" (監獄六区⑧, Kangoku Rokku 8); 53. "Prison Block Six 9" (監獄六区⑨, Kangoku Rokku 9)

=== Washizu: Tenka Sōsei Tōhairoku ===
| No. | Release date | ISBN |
|---|---|---|
| 1 | July 17, 2013 | 978-4-8124-8350-3 |
1. "And He Will Rise Again" (そしてヤツは甦る, Soshite Yatsu Wa Yomigaeru); 2. "Declaration of War" (宣戦布告, Sensenfukoku); 3. "The Wise Man's Bill" (賢人の手形, Kenjin no Tegata); 4. "Place Your Bids!" (入札せよ！, Nyūsatsu seyo!); 5. "Two Samurai" (2人のサムライ, Futari no Samurai); 6. "Washizu Wins Hands Down" (ワシズの勝ちは揺るがない, Washizu no Kachi wa Yuruganai)
| 2 | December 10, 2013 | 978-4-8124-8470-8 |
7. "What a wonderful number" 8. "Kyōsei Shock" (共生激震, Kyōsei Gekishin); 9. "Restart From Scratch" (ゼロからの再出発, Zero Kara no Saishuppatsu); 10. "Row House Mania Game Part One" (長屋狂騒局・前編, Nagaya kyōsō-kyoku zenpen); 11. "Row House Mania Game Part Two" (長屋狂騒局・後編, Nagaya kyōsō-kyoku kōhen); 12. "Mahjong Man Settlement House" (麻雀萬解決屋, Mājan man kaiketsu-ya)
| 3 | November 27, 2014 | 978-4-8019-5045-0 |
13. "The Curse of the Cellar 1" (地下室の呪い①, Chikashitsu no Noroi 1); 14. "The Curse of the Cellar 2" (地下室の呪い②, Chikashitsu no Noroi 2); 15. "The Curse of the Cellar 3" (地下室の呪い③, Chikashitsu no Noroi 3); 16. "The Curse of the Cellar 4" (地下室の呪い④, Chikashitsu no Noroi 4); 17. "The Curse of the Cellar 5" (地下室の呪い⑤, Chikashitsu no Noroi 5); 18. "Double Booking - Mahjong Sequence" (ダブルブッキング～麻雀シークエンス, Daburu Bukkingu ~ Mājan Shīkuensu)
| 4 | May 15, 2015 | 978-4-8019-5263-8 |
19. "Final Battle 1" (最終決戦①, Saishū Kessen 1); 20. "Final Battle 2" (最終決戦②, Saishū Kessen 2); 21. "Final Battle 3" (最終決戦③, Saishū Kessen 3); 22. "Final Battle 4" (最終決戦④, Saishū Kessen 4); 23. "Final Battle 5" (最終決戦⑤, Saishū Kessen 5); 24. "Final Battle 6" (最終決戦⑥, Saishū Kessen 6)
