= Yami-ma no Mamiya =

Japanese manga series

- First tankōbon volume cover

闇麻のマミヤ
- Genre: Mahjong
- Manga
- Written by: Nobuyuki Fukumoto
- Published by: Takeshobo
- Imprint: Kindai Mahjong Comics
- Magazine: Kindai Mahjong
- Original run: July 1, 2019 – present
- Volumes: 7
- icon

Yami-ma no Mamiya (闇麻のマミヤ; "Mamiya: Dark Mahjong") is a Japanese manga series written and illustrated by Nobuyuki Fukumoto. It is a sequel to Fukumoto's manga Ten, set 20 years later. It has been serialized in Takeshobo's Kindai Mahjong since July 2019. Yami-ma no Mamiya features a unique variant of mahjong, called "Yami Mahjong," or "Darkness Mahjong," in which point sticks are spent into a bank, called "dark deposits", in order to hide one's tile discards, as well as reveal these hidden discards at a higher price.

== Plot ==
Yami-ma no Mamiya begins its story in the Reiwa era, 20 years since the death of the legendary mahjong player, Akagi Shigeru. Nozaki Osamu (a minor character from Akagi) has opened up a ramen shop since, but continues to find himself involved in high-stakes mahjong.

One night, three young men approach Osamu's shop in search of a legendary mahjong player named Mamiya. They reveal themselves to be members of a J-pop boy-band called "Bakumatsu Men's Group". They share with Osamu that they are massively in debt to an entertainment producer named Onigashira Kanji, and that a single mahjong match with him could earn the young men their freedom, with the help of Mamiya.

Osamu relents, and temporarily sits in as their representative player as they wait for the appearance of Mamiya. After a period of rough plays, Mamiya finally arrives to replace Osamu in the battle against Onigashira and reveals herself to be a precocious teenage girl. In an attempt to provoke Onigashira, Mamiya bets her virginity as stakes in the gamble, and the two set off in a match of "Yami Mahjong".

== Publication ==
Yami-ma no Mamiya is written and illustrated by Nobuyuki Fukumoto. Fukumoto published a "chapter 0" in Takeshobo's Kindai Mahjong on May 1, 2019; it debuted as a serialized manga two months later in the same magazine on July 1. Its first part ended on May 1, 2023. Takeshobo has collected its chapters into individual tankōbon volumes. The first volume was published on December 6, 2019. As of September 26, 2023, seven volumes have been released.

=== Volumes ===
No.	Release date	ISBN
1	December 6, 2019	978-4-8019-6822-6
2	July 1, 2020	978-4-8019-7027-4
3	April 1, 2021	978-4-8019-7264-3
4	November 1, 2021	978-4-8019-7480-7
5	April 30, 2022	978-4-8019-7626-9
6	December 28, 2022	978-4-8019-7938-3
7	September 26, 2023	978-4-8019-8164-5

== Other media ==
In a collaborative event with Konami's mobile game Mahjong Fight Club Sp (麻雀格闘倶楽部Sp) in September 2023, Mamiya was added to the game, with the character being performed by voice actress and professional mahjong player Arisa Date.
