= Ten (manga) =

Japanese manga series

- Ten: Tenhō-dōri no Kaidanji
- First tankōbon volume cover, featuring Takashi Ten

天 天和通りの快男児
- Genre: Gambling; Mahjong
- Manga
- Written by: Nobuyuki Fukumoto
- Published by: Takeshobo
- Imprint: Kindai Mahjong Comics
- Magazine: Kindai Mahjong Gold
- Original run: 1989 – 2002
- Volumes: 18
- Manga

Hero: Akagi no Ishi o Tsugu Otoko
- Written by: Jirō Maeda; Nobuyuki Fukumoto (collaboration)
- Published by: Takeshobo
- Magazine: Kindai Mahjong
- Original run: October 1, 2009 – July 1, 2021
- Volumes: 18
- Television drama
- Directed by: Takashi Ninomiya; Keisuke Shibata; Ryō Miyawaki
- Produced by: Taku Matsumoto; Yūta Kurachi; Eiji Shibuya; Yasuko Kobayashi
- Written by: Nonji Nemoto; Yōsuke Masaike; Masaki Miyamoto
- Music by: Kuniyuki Morohashi
- Studio: TV Tokyo; The icon
- Original network: TV Tokyo
- Original run: October 4, 2018 – December 29, 2019
- Episodes: 17 + 1
- Manga

Rōkyō Bakutoden Soga
- Written by: Bingo Morihashi
- Illustrated by: Tomoki Miyoshi; Yoshiaki Seto
- Published by: Takeshobo
- Magazine: Kindai Mahjong
- Original run: June 1, 2023 – present
- Volumes: 1
- Spin-offs
- Akagi (1991–2018); Yami-ma no Mamiya (2019–present)
- icon

Ten: Tenhō-dōri no Kaidanji (天 天和通りの快男児; lit. Ten: The Nice Guy on the Path of Tenhō (Note: "Heavenly hand" – When the dealer wins on the first draw in mahjong.)) is a Japanese mahjong-themed manga series written and illustrated by Nobuyuki Fukumoto. It was serialized in Takeshobo's Kindai Mahjong Gold from 1989 to 2002, with its chapters collected in eighteen tankōbon volumes. Considered a hit in Japan, it was followed by a prequel focusing on one of the supporting characters Akagi in 1991.

A sequel series, set three years after the events of Ten, titled Hero: Akagi no Ishi o Tsugu Otoko, written and illustrated by Jirō Maeda with Fukumoto's collaboration, ran in Kindai Mahjong from October 2009 to July 2021. Another sequel, set 20 years after the events of Ten, titled Yami-ma no Mamiya, written and illustrated by Fukumoto, began in Kindai Mahjong in July 2019.

By August 2018, the manga had over 7 million copies in circulation.

== Plot ==
The story begins when Hiroyuki Igawa, who has a deep knowledge of the "logic" of mahjong, meets Takashi Ten, who runs a mahjong contracting business. Ten is a rep player with an unrivaled competitive edge and a strong will to win, and Hiroyuki begins to admire Ten and immerse himself in the world of mahjong. Eventually, Ten and Hiroyuki meet legendary mahjong player Shigeru Akagi, known as the "Man of the Divine Realm," as well as some of the best current mahjong players in the Kansai area, Katsumi Harada and Mitsui Soga, as they take on the challenge of fighting to determine the top of the Japanese underground mahjong world.

== Characters ==
=== East ===
Takashi Ten (天 貴史, Ten Takashi)
Portrayed by: Gorō Kishitani
A gambler (rep player) with an unparalleled competitive edge and a strong will. Despite having a history of winning against mahjong opponents through cheating, he is good-natured, loyal and compassionate, and at some point he changes his mind and acts from the standpoint of the weak. His kindness is sometimes directed at his opponents, and he occasionally acts to his detriment in order to preserve their honor, with the scars on his body being the remnants of this behavior. He is in a polygamous marriage, with two wives.
Hiroyuki Igawa (井川 ひろゆき, Igawa Hiroyuki)
Portrayed by: Yuki Furukawa
A young man who plays reasonably logical mahjong. In the first chapter, he appears as an entrance exam student, and as the story progresses, he ages to that of a university student and then a working man. Nicknamed Hiro, he initially played mahjong just to earn some money, but he gradually started to seek better opponents. He is drawn to the world of serious rep players and admires and respects Ten and Akagi with all his heart. Extremely intelligent, his ability to calculate and observe like a computer has impressed even Ten and other veteran gamblers, but he has a tendency to rely on logic too much and act too cautiously, which has often caused him to be outsmarted by his opponents.
Shigeru Akagi (赤木 しげる, Akagi Shigeru)
Portrayed by: Eisaku Yoshida
A legendary gambler who relies only on his own abilities without any support. He once reigned at the top of the underworld for about three years, but retired early because of his principle that position and fame would bind him. He has been called "a man of the divine realm", "fierce god", and "a once-in-a-century genius", and has countless legends to his credit. A fearless mahjong player with a natural ability to combine calmness and brilliance, he has a spirit of extraordinary wisdom and fearlessness towards death, as well as strong luck and intuition that is said to reach the godly realm. His view of life and death, in which he regarded himself as part of a larger cycle of life, and in which he dedicated himself to living his life "as Shigeru Akagi" without being bound by common sense or profit and loss, has become a source of discussion for many fans.
His childhood and young adulthood is described in the spin-off prequel Akagi, which has been made into V-Cinema films, an anime and a TV drama, and has become a popular work.
Ginji Asai (浅井 銀次, Asai Ginji)
Portrayed by: Yōji Tanaka
Once known as "Triple Run Ginji", he is the best player in Tokyo living in Shinjuku. His signature weapon is marking certain tiles. Despite his old age, he has a high level of perception that shows no signs of declining, and he has a crafty marking technique that goes beyond ordinary people's way of thinking. Due to the nature of his skills, he hates being exposed to the public eye and has never participated in major events.
Ken Igarashi (五十嵐 健, Igarashi Ken)
Portrayed by: Hidetoshi Hoshida
A young man who graduated from junior high school and claims that mahjong is his only redeeming feature. Like Hiroyuki, he is a young player participating in the East-West battle. He looks up to Ten as his older brother. He has a strong desire to rise in the world, and although he is a West player, in the East-West tournament, he stays with the East camp, which is at a disadvantage because of its thin layer of players.
Hitoshi Washio (鷲尾 仁, Washio Hitoshi)
One of the "North's Top Two" and the best player in Hokkaido. In the East-West tournament, he fights with Hiroyuki for a place in the finals. It appears that he and Akagi were close friends, and he went to Hawaii with Kanamitsu.
Shūzō Kanamitsu (金光 修蔵, Kanamitsu Shūzō)
Portrayed by: Ryōsei Tayama
One of the "North's Top Two" along with Washio. He is the chief priest of Seikan Temple, a mahjong temple in Iwate Prefecture in Tōhoku region. Like Washio, he has been close to Akagi for a long time, and because of this relationship, he becomes a monk in the final arc who takes on the role of taking care of Akagi's personal affairs, but he somewhat regrets his decision to accept the role and is distressed by it.

=== West ===
Katsumi Harada (原田 克美, Harada Katsumi)
Portrayed by: Koji Matoba
The leader of a gang in Osaka, one of the leading gangs in the Kansai area, and the organizer of the East-West battle, being the head of West. He is the best active player in the game and has been called "the king of the active players" and "the second coming of Akagi." His murderous tactics have been called "man-slaying mahjong" by Ten, and his sharpness has been likened to a straight-edge Japanese sword. Despite being a ruthless and forceful man who will stop at nothing to achieve his goals, his roots come from his fascination with mahjong, and in the final battle, in order to settle the score with Ten, he gave up his own interests and sought a two-player mahjong match with him.
Mitsui Soga (僧我 三威, Soga Mitsui)
Portrayed by: Denden
A legendary figure who won for more than ten years and was undefeated. Known as a "monster", he was the best player in the underworld until Akagi's appearance. Although he lacks Akagi's glamour and Harada's murderous spirit, he has an extremely high level of intuition that allows him to see the "darkness of mahjong" in a way that ordinary players cannot understand, and he has an uncanny ability to sneak up on players and attack them. After reigning as the lord of the underworld for over a decade, he retired, but his career was then blurred by the glamorous exploits of Akagi, who later also reigned over the underworld. Therefore, he has an almost hateful rivalry with Akagi, confronting him directly on many occasions.
Akutsu (阿久津)
Portrayed by: Takuya Nagaoka
A player from the San'in region who stays in the East-West finals. In fact, he was the only player to go undefeated in the East and West rounds.
Mitsui (三井)
Portrayed by: Noboru Kaneko
A player who remains in the finals but is at the mercy of Akagi's play.
Nangō (南郷)
A player from Hakata. In the second East-West preliminary match, he has the advantage in every game, but is chipped apart in small ways by Soga's marked tiles in the first round, Ten's tenacity in the next round, and Hiroyuki's clever schemes in the last round.
Sakaguchi (坂口)
A player who speaks with a Kansai dialect and fights against Akagi in the first East-West preliminary match.
Yoshii (吉井)
A player who, on Harada's orders, is replaced in the middle of the game by Ogami due to faking a sickness.
Kei Ogami (尾神 桂, Ogami Kei)
An assassin prepared by Harada to counter Ten, he is a hitman-like player who prioritizes the task of defeating Ten rather than winning. Even Harada was impressed by his heretical tactics, admitting he does not feel his humanity and that he did not expect him to be such a pro.

=== Miscellaneous ===
Sawada (沢田)
Portrayed by: Yoshiyuki Yamaguchi
One of the main characters in "Ten" in the early chapters. A chivalrous person full of humanity who yearns for the Toei yakuza of old. He discovered Hiroyuki's potential as a rep player when he sat down with him at a mahjong parlor and scouted him out. He used to have a wife and kids. Though he does not appear again after the beginning of the East-West tournament, he makes a reappearance in the spin-off series HERO.
Nakanishi (中西)
Portrayed by: Hajime Okayama
The owner of a ramen shop. He teams up with Ten and fights against Hiroyuki and Sawada.
Murota (室田)
Portrayed by: Kazuyuki Aijima
One of the best rep players in Osaka. His weapon of choice is "unloading mahjong", a technique that allows him to drop his opponent from the game under pressure. When Akagi received a request from a land shark to be a rep player, he is introduced by Murota to the team as his representative, making it appear that Akagi and Murota were close friends.
Urabe (浦部)
A professional rep player kept by the yakuza who appears in Akagi's recollections as someone he once fought.
Iwao Washizu (鷲巣 巌, Washizu Iwao)
The man who ruled Japan from behind the scenes in the late Showa era and appears in Akagi's recollections as someone he once fought.

== Media ==
=== Manga ===
Ten: Tenhōdōri No Kaidanji is written and illustrated by Nobuyuki Fukumoto. Fukumoto launched the manga in 1989 during Japan's economic boom, when gambling manga became popular. The manga was serialized in Takeshobo's magazine Kindai Mahjong Gold from 1989 to 2002. Takeshobo compiled its chapters into eighteen tankōbon volumes, published from August 21, 1989, to April 27, 2002. Takeshobo re-released the series into thirteen volumes published from July 31, 2015, to July 27, 2016.

A spin-off series focusing on Hiroyuki and taking place three years after the events of the main story, Hero: Akagi no Ishi o Tsugu Otoko (HERO アカギの遺志を継ぐ男; lit. 'Hero: A man who succeeds dying wishes of Akagi'), written and illustrated by Jirō Maeda, was serialized for 142 chapters in Kindai Mahjong from October 1, 2009, to July 1, 2021.

A prequel manga series focusing on one of the supporting characters Akagi was serialized from 1991 to 2018. A sequel created by Fukumoto, set twenty years after the events of Ten, titled Yami-ma no Mamiya, started in Kindai Mahjong in 2019.

A spin-off manga centered around Mitsui Soga, titled Rōkyō Bakutoden Soga (老境博徒伝SOGA), began serialization in Kindai Mahjong on June 1, 2023. The series is written by Bingo Morihashi and illustrated by Tomoki Miyoshi and Yoshiaki Seto. The first volume was released on April 1, 2024.

==== Volumes ====
===== Ten: Tenhōdōri No Kaidanji =====
No.	Release date	ISBN
1	August 21, 1989	978-4-88475-431-0
2	August 21, 1989	978-4-88475-432-7
3	May 31, 1990	978-4-88475-454-9
4	April 19, 1991	978-4-88475-505-8
5	April 24, 1992	978-4-88475-575-1
6	July 31, 1992	978-4-88475-596-6
7	April 22, 1993	978-4-88475-639-0
8	February 28, 1994	978-4-88475-699-4
9	February 27, 1995	978-4-88475-780-9
10	August 17, 1995	978-4-88475-833-2
11	July 27, 1996	978-4-81245-076-5
12	August 30, 1997	978-4-81245-145-8
13	August 27, 1998	978-4-81245-208-0
14	March 27, 1999	978-4-81245-287-5
15	May 27, 2000	978-4-81245-390-2
16	November 24, 2000	978-4-81245-456-5
17	June 27, 2001	978-4-81245-531-9
18	April 27, 2002	978-4-81245-648-4

===== Hero: Akagi no Ishi o Tsugu Otoko =====
No.	Release date	ISBN
1	June 11, 2010	978-4-8124-7288-0
2	February 26, 2011	978-4-8124-7516-4
3	July 27, 2011	978-4-8124-7643-7
4	June 27, 2012	978-4-8124-7916-2
5	January 26, 2013	978-4-8124-8093-9
6	December 10, 2013	978-4-8124-8471-5
7	July 28, 2014	978-4-8124-8745-7
8	July 31, 2015	978-4-8019-5319-2
9	May 16, 2016	978-4-8019-5520-2
10	December 15, 2016	978-4-8019-5705-3
11	November 1, 2017	978-4-8019-6095-4
12	June 27, 2018	978-4-8019-6309-2
13	October 15, 2018	978-4-8019-6408-2
14	May 1, 2019	978-4-8019-6602-4
15	December 6, 2019	978-4-8019-6823-3
16	July 1, 2020	978-4-8019-7028-1
17	April 21, 2021	978-4-8019-7265-0
18	November 1, 2021	978-4-8019-7481-4

=== Drama ===
A Japanese television drama adaptation starring Gorō Kishitani as Ten ran for 12 episodes on TV Tokyo's new drama slot "Drama Paravi," airing every Thursday (Wednesday midnight) at 1:35-2:05 from October 4 to December 20, 2018. Immediately after the first episode aired, all episodes were distributed in advance on the video distribution service Paravi, with an original episode taking place between episodes 11 and 12 releasing exclusively on the service on November 1. The show's theme song is "Tentomushi" (天道虫) by The Yellow Monkey.

A sequel adaptation of the last three volumes of the manga has been announced to premiere on TV Tokyo at the end of 2019. The mini-series, known as "Ten: Akagi Shigeru Funeral Arc" (天 赤木しげる葬式編, Ten Akagi Shigeru Sōshiki-hen), was broadcast on December 29 as a 2-hour special, while the full unedited 5-episode version was pre-distributed on Paravi on November 11. The Yellow Monkey's 1999 single "Barairo no Hibi" (バラ色の日々) was chosen to be its theme song.

==== Episodes ====
#	Title	Written by	Directed by	Original airdate
1	"The Unluckiest Mahjong (最凶の麻雀, Saikyō no mājan)"	Nonji Nemoto	Takashi Ninomiya	October 4, 2018
2	"Mahjong with Entire Property at Stake (全財産かけた麻雀, Zensaizan kaketa mājan)"	Nonji Nemoto	Takashi Ninomiya	October 11, 2018
3	"Akagi, the Strongest Mahjong Player (最強の雀士アカギ, Saikyō no janshi Akagi)"	Nonji Nemoto	Takashi Ninomiya	October 18, 2018
4	"Hell Wait on Four Closed Triplets (四暗刻地獄待ち, Sūankō jigoku-machi)"	Nonji Nemoto	Takashi Ninomiya	October 25, 2018
5	"East-West Battle with 35 Billion at Stake (350億賭けた東西戦, 350-oku kaketa tōsai-sen)"	Yōsuke Masaike	Keisuke Shibata	November 1, 2018
6	"Mahjong God Akagi's Play (雀神アカギの闘牌, Janshin Akagi no tōhai)"	Yōsuke Masaike	Keisuke Shibata	November 8, 2018
7	"Mahjong God Akagi's Counterattack (雀神アカギの逆襲, Janshin Akagi no gyakushū)"	Yōsuke Masaike	Keisuke Shibata	November 15, 2018
8	"Recovery with Four Closed Triplets (起死回生の四暗刻, Kishikaisei no sūankō)"	Yōsuke Masaike	Ryō Miyawaki	November 22, 2018
9	"Mahjong God Akagi is Defeated?! (雀神アカギ敗北!?, Janshin Akagi haiboku!?)"	Nonji Nemoto	Ryō Miyawaki	November 29, 2018
10	"Comeback! Mahjong of Hell (逆転! 地獄の麻雀, Gyakuten! Jigoku no mājan)"	Nonji Nemoto	Ryō Miyawaki	December 6, 2017
11	"Final Chapter! Two-Player Mahjong (最終章! 二人麻雀, Saishūshō! Futarimājan)"	Nonji Nemoto; Masaki Miyamoto	Takashi Ninomiya	December 13, 2018
11.5	"Original Episode (オリジナルエピソード, Orijinaru episōdo)"	Masaki Miyamoto	Takashi Ninomiya	November 1, 2018
12	"Ten: The Nice Guy on the Path of Tenhō (天 天和通りの快男児, Ten Tenhō-dōri no Kaidanji)"	Masaki Miyamoto	Takashi Ninomiya	December 20, 2018

=== Video game ===
A video game for PlayStation 2 by D3 Publisher was released on December 11, 2003.

== Reception ==
By August 2018, the Ten manga series had over 7 million copies in circulation.

== See also ==
- Gambling in Japan
