= List of Mudazumo Naki Kaikaku chapters =

Mudazumo Naki Kaikaku (ムダヅモ無き改革, Reform with No Wasted Draws; also known in English by its initial subtitle The Legend of Koizumi) is a satirical mahjong manga by Hideki Ohwada. It was initially irregularly serialized in the Kindai Mahjong Original manga magazine published by Takeshobo, then switched to bimonthly serialization on Takeshobo's other mahjong manga magazine Kindai Mahjong in April 2009. An anime adaptation was released on February 26, 2010, as an original video anime. The premise of the manga is that international diplomacy is settled on the mahjong table, with real-life politicians depicted as masters of mahjong. The Japanese title is a parody of Junichiro Koizumi's slogan, "Reform with No Sanctuary" (聖域無き改革, Seiiki Naki Kaikaku).

== Volume list ==
No.	Japanese release date	Japanese ISBN
1	September 5, 2008	978-4-8124-6869-2
001. "Battle in the Southern Sea" (南海の劇戦); 002. "Operation: Texas Shock" (テキサス電撃作戦); 003. "Cries of Victory in the Great Sea 1" (大海に響くは勝利の凱歌・1); 004. "Cries of Victory in the Great Sea 2" (大海に響くは勝利の凱歌・2); 005. "Attack of the Baltic Fleet 1" (襲来！！！バルチック艦隊・1); 006. "Attack of the Baltic Fleet 2" (襲来！！！バルチック艦隊・2); 007. "Attack of the Baltic Fleet 3" (襲来！！！バルチック艦隊・3)
2	August 7, 2009	978-4-8124-7140-1
"Approaching Threat Prologue (迫りくる脅威【プロローグ】); 008. "Approaching Threat 1" (迫りくる脅威・1); 009. "Approaching Threat 2" (迫りくる脅威・2); 010. "Approaching Threat 3" (迫りくる脅威・3); 011. "Outbreak! Twilight of the Gods (Ragnarok) War 1" (勃発！〝 神々の黄昏（ラグナロク） 〞大戦・1); 012. "Outbreak! Twilight of the Gods (Ragnarok) War 2" (勃発！〝 神々の黄昏（ラグナロク） 〞大戦・2); 013. "Outbreak! Twilight of the Gods (Ragnarok) War 3" (勃発！〝 神々の黄昏（ラグナロク） 〞大戦・3); 014. "Outbreak! Twilight of the Gods (Ragnarok) War 4" (勃発！〝 神々の黄昏（ラグナロク） 〞大戦・4); 015. "Outbreak! Twilight of the Gods (Ragnarok) War 5" (勃発！〝 神々の黄昏（ラグナロク） 〞大戦・5)
3	December 26, 2009	978-4-8124-7218-7
016. "Outbreak! Twilight of the Gods (Ragnarok) War 6" (勃発！〝 神々の黄昏（ラグナロク） 〞大戦・6); 017. "Outbreak! Twilight of the Gods (Ragnarok) War 7" (勃発！〝 神々の黄昏（ラグナロク） 〞大戦・7); 018. "Outbreak! Twilight of the Gods (Ragnarok) War 8" (勃発！〝 神々の黄昏（ラグナロク） 〞大戦・8); 019. "Outbreak! Twilight of the Gods (Ragnarok) War 9" (勃発！〝 神々の黄昏（ラグナロク） 〞大戦・9); 020. "Outbreak! Twilight of the Gods (Ragnarok) War 10" (勃発！〝 神々の黄昏（ラグナロク） 〞大戦・10); 021. "Outbreak! Twilight of the Gods (Ragnarok) War 11" (勃発！〝 神々の黄昏（ラグナロク） 〞大戦・11); 021. "Outbreak! Twilight of the Gods (Ragnarok) War 12" (勃発！〝 神々の黄昏（ラグナロク） 〞大戦・12); 023. "Outbreak! Twilight of the Gods (Ragnarok) War 13" (勃発！〝 神々の黄昏（ラグナロク） 〞大戦・13)
4	May 17, 2010	978-4-8124-7267-5
024. "Outbreak! Twilight of the Gods (Ragnarok) War 14" (勃発！〝 神々の黄昏（ラグナロク） 〞大戦・14); 025. "Outbreak! Twilight of the Gods (Ragnarok) War 15" (勃発！〝 神々の黄昏（ラグナロク） 〞大戦・15); 026. "Outbreak! Twilight of the Gods (Ragnarok) War 16" (勃発！〝 神々の黄昏（ラグナロク） 〞大戦・16); 027. "Outbreak! Twilight of the Gods (Ragnarok) War 17" (勃発！〝 神々の黄昏（ラグナロク） 〞大戦・17); 028. "Outbreak! Twilight of the Gods (Ragnarok) War 18" (勃発！〝 神々の黄昏（ラグナロク） 〞大戦・18); 029. "Outbreak! Twilight of the Gods (Ragnarok) War 19" (勃発！〝 神々の黄昏（ラグナロク） 〞大戦・19); 030. "Outbreak! Twilight of the Gods (Ragnarok) War 20" (勃発！〝 神々の黄昏（ラグナロク） 〞大戦・20); 031. "Outbreak! Twilight of the Gods (Ragnarok) War 21" (勃発！〝 神々の黄昏（ラグナロク） 〞大戦・21)
5	November 17, 2010	978-4-8124-7461-7
032. "Outbreak! Twilight of the Gods (Ragnarok) War 22" (勃発！〝 神々の黄昏（ラグナロク） 〞大戦・22); 033. "Outbreak! Twilight of the Gods (Ragnarok) War 23" (勃発！〝 神々の黄昏（ラグナロク） 〞大戦・23); 034. "Outbreak! Twilight of the Gods (Ragnarok) War 24" (勃発！〝 神々の黄昏（ラグナロク） 〞大戦・24); 035. "Outbreak! Twilight of the Gods (Ragnarok) War 25" (勃発！〝 神々の黄昏（ラグナロク） 〞大戦・25); 036. "Outbreak! Twilight of the Gods (Ragnarok) War 26" (勃発！〝 神々の黄昏（ラグナロク） 〞大戦・26); 037. "Outbreak! Twilight of the Gods (Ragnarok) War 27" (勃発！〝 神々の黄昏（ラグナロク） 〞大戦・27); 038. "Outbreak! Twilight of the Gods (Ragnarok) War 28" (勃発！〝 神々の黄昏（ラグナロク） 〞大戦・28); 039. "Outbreak! Twilight of the Gods (Ragnarok) War 29" (勃発！〝 神々の黄昏（ラグナロク） 〞大戦・29); 040. "Outbreak! Twilight of the Gods (Ragnarok) War 30" (勃発！〝 神々の黄昏（ラグナロク） 〞大戦・30); 041.
6	March 26, 2011	978-4-8124-7525-6
Chapter 42.; Chapter 43.; Chapter 44.; Chapter 45.; Chapter 46.; Chapter 47.; Chapter 48.; Chapter 49.
7	January 1, 2012	978-4-8124-7736-6
Chapter 50.; Chapter 51.; Chapter 52.; Chapter 53.; Chapter 54.; Chapter 55.; Chapter 56.; Chapter 57.; Chapter 58.
8	June 27, 2012	978-4-8124-7914-8
Chapter 59.; Chapter 60.; Chapter 61.; Chapter 62.; Chapter 63.; Chapter 64.; Chapter 65.; Chapter 66.; Chapter 67.
9	December 26, 2012	978-4-8124-8066-3
Chapter 68.; Chapter 69.; Chapter 70.; Chapter 71.; Chapter 72.; Chapter 73.; Chapter 74.; Chapter 75.; Chapter 76.
10	May 17, 2013	978-4-8124-8175-2
Chapter 77.; Chapter 78.; Chapter 79.; Chapter 80.; Chapter 81.; Chapter 82.; Chapter 83.; Chapter 84.; Chapter 85.
11	October 17, 2013	978-4-8124-8426-5
Chapter 86.; Chapter 87.; Chapter 88.; Chapter 89.; Chapter 90.; Chapter 91.; Chapter 92.; Chapter 93.; Chapter 94.
12	March 28, 2014	978-4-8124-8544-6
Chapter 95.; Chapter 96.; Chapter 97.; Chapter 98.; Chapter 99.; Chapter 100.; Chapter 101.; Chapter 102.; Chapter 103.
13	August 9, 2014	978-4-8124-8741-9
Chapter 104.; Chapter 105.; Chapter 106.; Chapter 107.; Chapter 108.; Chapter 109.; Chapter 110.; Chapter 111.; Chapter 112.
14	December 15, 2014	978-4-8019-5046-7
Chapter 113.; Chapter 114.; Chapter 115.; Chapter 116.; Chapter 117.; Chapter 118.; Chapter 119.; Chapter 120.; Chapter 121.
15	May 29, 2015	978-4-8019-5261-4
Chapter 122.; Chapter 123.; Chapter 124.; Chapter 125.; Chapter 126.; Chapter 127.; Chapter 128.; Chapter 129.; Chapter 130.
16	October 1, 2015	978-4-8019-5360-4
Chapter 131.; Chapter 132.; Chapter 133.; Chapter 134.; Chapter 135.; Chapter 136.; Chapter 137.; Chapter 138.; Chapter 139.
