= Iron Wok Jan =

Japanese manga series

- Cover of the first Japanese volume

鉄鍋のジャン! (Tetsunabe no Jan!)
- Genre: Cooking, martial arts
- Manga
- Written by: Shinji Saijyo
- Published by: Akita Shoten
- English publisher: NA: ComicsOne; DrMaster
- Imprint: Shōnen Champion Comics
- Magazine: Weekly Shōnen Champion
- Original run: June 1995 – March 2000
- Volumes: 27
- Manga

Iron Wok Jan! R: The Summit Operations
- Written by: Shinji Saijyo
- Published by: Akita Shoten
- Imprint: Shōnen Champion Comics
- Magazine: Weekly Shōnen Champion
- Original run: November 9, 2006 – December 9, 2010
- Volumes: 10
- Manga

Tetsupai no Jan!
- Written by: Bingo Morihashi
- Published by: Takeshobo
- Imprint: Kindai Mahjong Comics
- Magazine: Kindai Mahjong
- Original run: August 12, 2015 – December 28, 2017
- Volumes: 7
- Manga

Iron Wok Jan 2nd
- Written by: Shinji Saijyo
- Published by: Fujimi Shobo
- Imprint: Dragon Comics Age
- Magazine: Monthly Dragon Age
- Original run: January 7, 2017 – 2019
- Volumes: 7
- Anime television series
- Directed by: Ei Aoki
- Written by: Makoto Uezu
- Music by: Tomoki Kikuya
- Studio: Troyca
- Licensed by: Crunchyroll
- Original network: TXN (TV Tokyo)
- Original run: July 5, 2026 – September 20, 2026
- Episodes: 12
- icon

Iron Wok Jan (Japanese: 鉄鍋のジャン!, Hepburn: Tetsunabe no Jan!) is a Japanese manga series written and illustrated by Shinji Saijyo. It was serialized in Akita Shoten's shōnen manga magazine Weekly Shōnen Champion from June 1995 to March 2000. The manga follows a chef named Jan Akiyama as he works in a high-end Chinese restaurant and competes in various cooking competitions.

A sequel, titled Iron Wok Jan! R: The Summit Operations, was serialized in Weekly Shōnen Champion from December 2006 to November 2010. A spin-off written and illustrated by Bingo Morihashi, titled Tetsupai no Jan!, was serialized in Takeshobo's magazine Kindai Mahjong from August 2015 to December 2017. Another sequel, titled Iron Wok Jan 2nd, was serialized in Fujimi Shobo's magazine Monthly Dragon Age from January 2017 to 2019. An anime television series adaptation produced by Troyca aired from July to September 2026.

== Plot ==
One night after the restaurant closed, a boy walks into a high-end Chinese restaurant in Ginza, Tokyo, and orders fried rice. After being served, the boy realized that it was of poor quality, he throws it away and enters the kitchen to make fried rice himself. The boy's name is Jan Akiyama, the grandson of Kaiichiro Akiyama, the "master of Chinese cuisine". Eventually, Jan, who believes that cooking is a battle, begins working in the restaurant with other chefs like Kiriko.

== Characters ==
=== Akiyama family ===
Jan Akiyama (秋山 醤, Akiyama Jan)
Voiced by: Kikunosuke Toya
Jan Akiyama is a 16-year-old talented young chef and the male protagonist of the manga. His grandfather is Kaiichiro Akiyama, the "master of Chinese cuisine". He believes cooking is a competition and even goes out of his way to choose the most strange and difficult ingredients in order to thoroughly crush his opponents in culinary contests.
Kaiichiro Akiyama (秋山 階一郎, Akiyanma Kaiichirō)
Kaiichiro Akiyama is known as the "master of Chinese cuisine". Kaiichiro raised Jan until his tastebuds began to fail, at which point he sent Jan to Gobancho and committed suicide by self-immolation.
Minki Tou (桃 明輝, Tō Minki)
Minki Tou is Jan's grandmother and Kaiichiro's wife.
Baku Akiyama (秋山 爆, Akiyama Baku)
Baku Akiyama is Jan's father and Kaiichiro's son.

=== Gobanchou family ===
Kiriko Gobanchou (五番町 霧子, Gobanchō Kiriko)
Voiced by: Ikumi Hasegawa
Kiriko Gobanchou is one of the best cooks in Gobanchou, her family's Chinese restaurant in Ginza. She is the same age as Jan. She believes cooking is about heart and despises Jan for his arrogant attitude and often cruel methods.
Takao Okonogi (小此木 タカオ, Okonogi Takao)
Voiced by: Kōhei Amasaki
Mutsuju Gobanchou (五番町 睦十, Gobanchō Mutsuju)

=== Other characters ===
Nichido Otani (大谷 日堂, Otani Nichido)
Voiced by: Masuo Amada
Celene Yang (セレーヌ楊, Serēnu Yō)
Voiced by: M.A.O
Kei Sawada (沢田 圭, Sawada Kei)
Voiced by: Takahiro Sakurai
Tomohide Jun (荀 智秀, Jun Tomohide)
Voiced by: Taishi Murata
Yuji Kawahara (河原裕司, Kawahara Yuji)
Voiced by: Yūsuke Kobayashi
Ryūji Bitō (尾藤リュウジ, Bitō Ryūji)
Voiced by: Tomokazu Sugita

== Media ==
=== Manga ===
Written and illustrated by Shinji Saijyo, Iron Wok Jan was serialized in Akita Shoten's shōnen manga magazine Weekly Shōnen Champion from 1995 to 2000, with its individual chapters were collected into 27 tankōbon volumes, and subsequently re-released into 16 kanzenban volumes between December 2004 and September 2007. The manga was licensed in English by ComicsOne before the license was transferred to DrMaster. Collectively, they published the manga's 27 tankōbon volumes in English between December 15, 2002, and December 28, 2007.

A sequel, titled Iron Wok Jan! R: The Summit Operations (鉄鍋のジャン!R 頂上作戦, Tetsunabe no Jan! R: Chōjō Sakusen), was serialized in Weekly Shōnen Champion from November 9, 2006, to December 9, 2010. Its individual chapters were collected into ten tankōbon volumes.

A spin-off series, titled Tetsupai no Jan! (鉄牌のジャン!) and written and illustrated by Bingo Morihashi, was serialized on Takeshobo's Kindai Mahjong magazine from August 12, 2015, to December 28, 2017. Its individual chapters were collected into seven tankōbon volumes. Another sequel manga, titled Iron Work Jan 2nd, was serialized in Fujimi Shobo's magazine Monthly Dragon Age from January 7, 2017, to 2019. Its individual chapters were collected into seven tankōbon volumes.

=== Anime ===
An anime television series adaptation was announced on December 15, 2025. It is produced by Troyca and directed by Ei Aoki, with series composition handled by Makoto Uezu, characters designed by Masako Matsumoto who is also serving as chief animation director, and music composed by Tomoki Kikuya. The series aired from July 5 to September 20, 2026, on TV Tokyo and its affiliates. The opening theme song is "Kaen" (火宴; Fire Banquet), performed by Genin wa Jibun ni Aru, while the ending theme song is "Naita Akuma" (泣いた悪魔; 'The Devil Who Cried'), performed by Emunimini. Crunchyroll streamed the series.

==== Episodes ====
No.	Title	Directed by (Note: Production staff information is taken from the ending credits of each episode.)	Written by	Storyboarded by	Original release date
1	"Flames and Meetings"; Transliteration: "Honō to no Deai" (Japanese: 炎との出逢い)	Ei Aoki	Makoto Uezu	Ei Aoki	July 5, 2026
A young man named Jan Akiyama arrives at Gobanchou, the premier Chinese restaurant in Tokyo. He orders a bowl of their famous fried rice, and storms the kitchen and criticizes its poor quality. Incensed, he cooks his own take on fried rice, incorporating radish and tofu. Despite the unconventional approach, the other cooks are forced to admit it is delicious. Kiriko Gobanchou, the heir to the restaurant, is taken off guard. The head chef Yaichi explains Jan is the grandson of Kaiichiro Akiyama, the greatest rival of Mutsuju Gobanchou, the owner of Gobanchou and Kiriko's grandfather. Jan has arrived at the restaurant to honor Kaiichiro's dying wish and is hired as a trainee cook. The next day, Kiriko cooks lunch for the other cooks, presenting a veal and gizzard dish with the gaminess removed with careful preparation. Jan criticizes Kiriko for playing too safe, and responds with stir fried pork liver, using milk to neutralize the gaminess. He declares that cooking is a competition, while Kiriko insists cooking is about the heart, and the two become rivals.
2	"They're Like Gunpowder"; Transliteration: "Kayaku no yōna Yatsu" (Japanese: 火薬のようなやつら)	Ei Aoki	Tomoharu Suzuki	Hiroki Hayashi	July 12, 2026
The cooks watch food critic Nichido Otani's show, where he uses his "golden palate" to harshly judge every dish presented to him based on just sight and smell alone. Yaichi announces that Otani will be arriving tonight to dine at Gobanchou and plans to impress him with his cooking. However, he suddenly collapses from a severe fever. Both Jan and Kiriko volunteer to take his place, as they are motivated to get one over on the normally arrogant Otani. Kiriko presents a chawanmushi dish to Otani, who fails to spot that she incorporated silkie eggs into the dish to give it its signature richness. While cooking his dish, Jan recalls the harsh training his grandfather subjected him to. Jan then presents his own take on chawanmushi, which Otani cannot resist eating as well, but cannot guess the secret ingredient. Jan reveals that he used lamb brain in the dish. Realizing Jan is Kaiichiro's grandson, Otani flees the restaurant and promises to get his revenge on Gobanchou for humiliating him.
3	"A Loser's Cry of Victory"; Transliteration: "Makeinu no Kachidoki" (Japanese: 負け犬の勝鬨)	Ei Aoki	Makoto Uezu	Minori Mizuno	July 19, 2026
Impressed with Jan's skills, Yaichi tasks him with cooking fifty orders of shredded beef and pepper stir fry. Jan assumes that he can simply multiply the amount of ingredients and seasoning for the necessary number, but is shocked when he realizes the stir fry doesn't taste right. Yaichi chews out Jan for his subpar cooking and replaces him with Kiriko. Realizing he made a mistake due to his inexperience cooking for large parties, Jan retreats to the back alley to sulk. However, fellow trainee chef Takao Okonogi comes to cheer him up, and when he mentions his stir fry always ends up too watery, Jan figures out his mistake, in that he has to account for a larger amount of ingredients holding more moisture in a stir fry, so he has to adjust his seasoning accordingly. He quickly creates a new batch that tastes right, and Kiriko is slightly disappointed he figured it out by himself since she intended to teach him the technique. Later, Jan and Okonogi go on a camping trip where they cook wild caught quail inside a chicken. That night, Jan recalls Kaiichiro teaching him how to cook deer tendon in under an hour, stressing that an Akiyama cook needs to be unconventional to maintain their "mystique". However, realizing that he is losing his sense of taste, Kaiichiro arranges for Jan to be sent to Gobanchou before committing suicide by immolating himself. Despite this painful memory, Jan inherits his grandfather's desire to best Gobanchou.
4	"He Who Masters Poison"; Transliteration: "Doku wo Gyosumono" (Japanese: 毒を御す者)	Ei Aoki	Tomoharu Suzuki	Yutaka Yamamoto	July 26, 2026
Okonogi tries to prepare lunch for the other cooks, but they are unimpressed with his stir fry. Mutsuji then offers to demonstrate how to properly cook stir fry, using his special technique "Heat Zone" to trap all of the heat into the ingredients, ensuring they all cook evenly. Realizing Mutsuji is truly a rival to his grandfather, Jan promises to surpass him, though Kiriko reminds him that he needs to defeat her first. Meanwhile, Otani hires the traveling chef Ryuji Bito in a plot to get revenge against Gobanchou. Otani approaches the restaurant and challenges them to a cook off between Jan and Bito, with the condition that if Jan loses, he must be fired. Bito then cooks a dish using his signature XO jiang sauce which all of the cooks are impressed with, though Jan boasts his version is better. He cooks Chaliapin steak combined with his own XO jiang, which Bito is forced to admit is superior. Jan points out that Bito relies on the taste of XO jiang as a crutch, rather than using it to enhance a dish's existing flavor like a true cook would. Kiriko is able to deduce the secret ingredient of Jan's XO jiang being red oil shallots, and Jan is impressed she was able to figure it out.
5	"The Magic of Bliss"; Transliteration: "Shifuku no Magic" (Japanese: 至福の調合)	Ei Aoki	Makoto Uezu	Hiroki Hayashi	August 2, 2026
Still determined to get revenge on Jan and Gobanchou, Otani suggests to his business partners to organize a national Chinese cooking tournament and invite young chefs from all over Japan. Jan and Kiriko are selected to represent Gobanchou in the tournament. On the day of the qualifiers, numerous famous cooks arrive to participate, though most of the attention is on Jan and Kiriko due to their famous lineages. Jan's block is tasked with making a soup dish, and Jan notices one of his opponents, Fujita Kanichi, is the biggest threat to him due to his expertise in medicinal cuisine. Jan then decides to use mushrooms as his main ingredient. During the judging, the judges initially are not impressed with Jan's mushroom soup and it appears Fujita will be the winner, until they suddenly get a craving for Jan's soup and give him a perfect score. Jan explains he used Strophariaceae and Cortinariaceae, which when combined together in the right proportions creates a powerful hallucinogenic effect. Kiriko angrily punches Jan for his disregard for the people eating his food, while another contestant, Sawada Kei, voices his disgust for Jan's methods and promises to defeat him.
6	"The Soul of Chinese Cooking"; Transliteration: "Chūka no Shinsui" (Japanese: 中華の神髄)	Ei Aoki	Tomoharu Suzuki	Ei Aoki, Kenji Seto	August 9, 2026
It turns out Sawada's anger is merely an act in front of the cameras to turn public opinion against Jan, all according to Otani's plan. As the first round begins, it is explained that judging will be split between a panel of judges and the audience, with both parties contributing up to 100 points each, though Otani also happens to be one of the judges. The theme is selected to be beef, and Sawada brings in a massive, superheated griddle as his secret weapon. He then proceeds to use the highest quality cuts of meat to prepare steak skewers, while Jan uses the lowest quality cut to create a rice dish with a starchy vegetable and meat sauces. While the judges are initially taken in by Sawada's theatrical performance, they ultimately come to realize Jan, who brought out the maximum amount of flavor with the lowest quality ingredients, embodies the soul of Chinese cooking more and Jan wins by a massive margin. After the first round, it is revealed Jan is self conscious about the scars on his back, caused by Kaiichiro's harsh training. Kiriko happens to see them and expresses her concern, only for Jan to brush it off by claiming they are proof of his dedication to cooking.
7	"Toss That Wok!"; Transliteration: "Nabe wo fure！" (Japanese: 鍋を振れ！)	Ei Aoki	Makoto Uezu	Minori Mizuno	August 16, 2026
Jan's next opponent for the second round is Yuji Kawahara, who is equally unpopular with the audience due his use of science and technology to cook as well as his condescending attitude towards traditional chefs. The match theme is chosen to be poultry, and both Jan and Kawahara decide to go with stuffed chicken dishes. Kawahara starts with a sous vide chicken stuffed with shark fin, completely automating the cooking with his advanced equipment. Jan by contrast cooks a simpler chicken stuffed with glass noodles, but uses much more complex methods by steaming, frying, and then simmering the chicken. He then taunts Kawahara by boasting his dish has absorbed a superior amount of umami, which causes Kawahara to add shincha sauce to his dish in the final preparation phase. The judges then try the dishes, and quickly criticize Kawahara's dish as being a mishmash of ingredients that fails to create a cohesive flavor, partly caused by his last minute addition of the shincha. Meanwhile, the judges praise Jan's dish and declare him the winner. Jan then boasts that Kawahara's last minute addition of shincha and his reliance on machines indicates he has no confidence in his own cooking. Jan also proclaims his own extensive experience makes him the superior chef.
8	"Malice"; Transliteration: "Aku'i" (Japanese: 悪意)	Ei Aoki	Tomoharu Suzuki	Hiroki Hayashi	August 23, 2026
The tournament continues, with Kiriko advancing to the finals while dark horse contestant Celene Yang from Kobe's Sea Dragon also manages to reach the finals. Celene quickly proves popular among the audience due to her easygoing nature. Jan meanwhile faces off against Omae Kota, a popular chef who works at a local restaurant. The theme ingredient is revealed to be lotus root, which causes both contestants to pause since there are numerous different ways to prepare it. Determined not to let his customers down, Kota decides to cook a relatively new dish that he has learned, and presents a combination of lotus root and eel stir fried in coconut milk. Despite not appearing to do much, Jan is able to finish is steamed lotus soup first, which actually turns out to be tong sui due to adding granulated sugar for a sweet taste. Jan makes sure to serve the judges first, and they enjoy the tong sui, being nearly full from the previous two semifinal matches. They then reluctantly try Kota's dish, and criticize how it is too heavy and oily after having gone cold, despite Kota's protests they took too long drinking the tong sui. In addition, eating such a heavy food after having a light soup causes many of the judges to fall ill, all according to Jan's plan. As Jan gloats about his victory over Kota, Kiriko becomes even more committed to defeating him to prove him wrong.
9	"Innovating For the Future"; Transliteration: "Mirai e no Dokusō" (Japanese: 未来への独創)	Ei Aoki	Tomoharu Suzuki	Ei Aoki, Hiromi Nishiyama	August 30, 2026
While Kota is comforted by his fans, Jan takes another opportunity to gloat which causes a fight between him and Kiriko that results in them falling into a fountain. Jan then cooks a special medicinal desert for the both of them to stave off colds, and tells her he still won't change his philosophy on cooking. Believing Jan will not be a good fit for Gobanchou, Kiriko declares that if she defeats in him in the championship, he must leave the restaurant. On the day of the final match, Jan, Kiriko and Celene are informed the theme is to cook both a noodle dish and dessert. Yaichi observes that the intent of this challenge is to see which chef can best embody what the future of Chinese cooking will be. Celene recalls her father's "nouvelle chinois" cooking style which focuses on fusing Chinese and Western cooking techniques, and proceeds to prepare what appear to be black squid dumplings. Jan decides to go with a complex dao xiao mian dish, only possible thanks to his constant training and muscle memory. Kiriko meanwhile reveals a special red dough that she plans to use for her noodles.
10	"The Judges' Focus"; Transliteration: "Shinsa no Shōten" (Japanese: 審査の焦点)	Ei Aoki	Tomoharu Suzuki	Katsuhito Akiyama	September 6, 2026
It is revealed that the red dough Kiriko is using for her shanhumian dish got its color due to having carrot juice mixed with it. Celene serves her dish first, Korean style noodles shaped in the form of Italian ravioli. Jan serves his daxiaomian with three different types of sauces, along with a secret weapon: a special blend of Shangxi black vinegar created by the Akiyama family. Kiriko presents her red coral colored cold noodles wrapped around vegetables and meat with vegetable dipping sauce, all served atop an ice sculpture. The judges are impressed with all three dishes. During the judging, all three contestants are evenly matched in the audience vote, but none of the judges vote for Jan, putting him distant third behind Kiriko and Celene. Jan angrily confronts the judges, who point out that they were looking for innovation and personal expression in the final round, of which Jan had none since he had merely copied an existing recipe. They also point out Celene strayed too far from the intent of the competition by using too many non-Chinese ingredients and cooking techniques. Kiriko, on the other hand, understood how to use existing Chinese ingredients to make something completely new. Jan loses the first round of the finals and is heckled by the audience and Otani. Suffering a nervous breakdown, Jan appears to gain inspiration from seeing his own blood, and returns to the second round with a renewed confidence.
11	"Bloody Baptism!"; Transliteration: "Chi no Senrei！" (Japanese: 血の洗礼！)	Ei Aoki	Makoto Uezu	Katsuhito Akiyama	September 13, 2026
The second round starts as the three chefs decide what to make for their dessert dishes. However, Okonogi is worried since nobody has ever seen Jan make a dessert before. While Kiriko and Celene collect their ingredients, Jan captures several pigeons, with Yaiichi realizing he plans to make "ru ge", a dish that incorporates pigeon meat. Celene focuses on using frog oviduct as her main ingredient, while Kiriko decides on making a selection of various desserts. Jan however shocks everybody when he slaughters his captured pigeons and drains their blood. Yaiichi then comes to realize that Jan intends to use the blood instead of the meat. While blood is a traditional ingredient in many cuisines, nobody has heard of a blood based dessert before, and the audience soon becomes obsessed with what Jan will create, the audience runs to get the dessert but Jan stops them as they have no right to ruin the tournament and tells them they are idiots for trying to cause a riot. Jan presents his dish first, which has blood molded into an egg shape coated in four different seasonings. The judges are all amazed by the taste of the bloody eggs, including Otani, while the audience demands to be able to taste the dessert for themselves as well. Jan then challenges the judges to figure out the secret behind his dessert.
12	"Nightmares, Followed by Clear Skies!"; Transliteration: "Akumu, nochi Hare!" (Japanese: 悪夢、のち晴れ！)	Ei Aoki	Makoto Uezu	Ei Aoki, Minori Mizuno	September 20, 2026
The judges are amazed at Jan's ability to enhance the flavor the blood in his dish while at the same time removing its negative aspects. They are also impressed at his use of extremely rare swiftlet nest as a seasoning. They then try Kiriko's three dessert dish but criticize it for being too derivative and lacking innovation. They then try Celene's dessert, which is a baked papaya with pudding incorporating frog oviduct, and point out that frog oviduct may appeal to gourmands, but will not necessarily be palatable to regular diners. Otani meanwhile does his best to influence the other judges to vote for Celene's dish, only for Jan to call him out. Losing his temper, Otani beats Jan on stage, ruining his reputation and getting ejected from venue. During the judging, the audience overwhelmingly votes in Jan's favor, while the judges are split between Jan and Kiriko which results in Otani being the tiebreaking vote. He casts his vote for Kiriko and gloats to Jan, who knocks him out in revenge. Afterwards, Kiriko feels unsatisfied despite winning the tournament. Okonogi meets up with Jan outside and see people attempting to catch pigeons to copy Jan's dish. They then both take their leave, happy with the knowledge that Jan is the true winner.

== Reception ==
Comics Worth Reading's Johanna Draper Carlson liked the use of caricatures to dramatize the manga. Manga Life's Michael Aronson commended the manga for its art and its ability to appeal to audiences. Animefringe's Ridwan Khan liked the "love-hate relationship" between Jan and Kiriko. IGN's A.E. Sparrow felt the artist did a great job in making a cooking competition as compelling to watch "as watching two feudal clans go to war".
