= Akagi (manga) =

Japanese manga series

- First tankōbon volume cover, featuring Shigeru Akagi

アカギ 〜闇に降り立った天才〜 (Akagi: Yami ni Oritatta Tensai)
- Genre: Mahjong; Gambling; Psychological
- Manga
- Written by: Nobuyuki Fukumoto
- Published by: Takeshobo
- Magazine: Kindai Mahjong
- Original run: June 1, 1991 – February 1, 2018
- Volumes: 36
- Anime television series

Tōhai Densetsu Akagi: Yami ni Maiorita Tensai
- Directed by: Yūzō Satō
- Produced by: Manabu Tamura; Masao Maruyama; Toshio Nakatani
- Written by: Hideo Takayashiki
- Music by: Hideki Taniuchi
- Studio: Madhouse
- Original network: Nippon TV
- Original run: October 5, 2005 – March 29, 2006
- Episodes: 26
- Television drama
- Directed by: Mitsuru Kubota; Hitoshi Iwamoto (S1–2); Hiroshi Itō (S1–2)
- Produced by: Atsushi Nagauchi; Hiroshi Itō
- Written by: Mitsuru Tanabe; Eizo Kobayashi (S1)
- Music by: Tarō Makido
- Original network: BS SKY PerfecTV!
- Original run: July 17, 2015 – June 8, 2018
- Episodes: 18
- Spin-offs
- Ten: Tenhō-dōri no Kaidanji (1989–2002); Yami-ma no Mamiya (2019–present)
- icon

Akagi: Yami ni Oritatta Tensai (アカギ 〜闇に降り立った天才〜; lit. 'Akagi: The Genius Who Descended into Darkness') is a Japanese manga series written and illustrated by Nobuyuki Fukumoto. First published in 1991 in Takeshobo's weekly magazine Kindai Mahjong, it is a spin-off prequel to the author's previous work Ten. It revolves around Shigeru Akagi, a boy who defeats yakuza members well versed in mahjong at 13. He returns to the game six years later, carrying a mythical status and still impresses his opponents.

It was adapted as two V-Cinema live-action films directed by Kenzō Maihara in 1995 and 1997. A 26-episode anime television series directed by Yūzō Satō was broadcast on Nippon Television from October 2005 to March 2006. Two live-action television dramas directed by Mitsuru Kubota aired on BS SKY PerfecTV! between July 2015 and June 2018. The series has also spawned several companion books, spin-off manga, video games, and other merchandise.

By February 2017, the Akagi manga series had over 12 million copies in circulation.

== Plot ==
The story revolves around the mahjong gambling exploits of Shigeru Akagi (赤木 しげる, Akagi Shigeru) (voiced by Masato Hagiwara in the anime adaptation). After a death-defying game of chicken one evening in 1958, Akagi nonchalantly enters a yakuza mahjong parlor to shake the police's trail. Although he is unfamiliar with the rules of mahjong, his gambling intuition saves a small-time gambler, Nangō (南郷) (voiced by Rikiya Koyama), and grants him a seat at the gambling table. As the night progresses, the stakes are raised both within the game and for Akagi, who is under the suspicion of the local policeman, Yasuoka (安岡) (voiced by Tessho Genda). However, Akagi manages to defeat Keiji Yagi (矢木 圭次, Yagi Keiji) (voiced by Wataru Takagi)—despite Yagi's cheating during the game—and impresses the members of the gambling house. Yasuoka arranges a new match against other yakuza members, in which Akagi defeats Ichikawa (市川) (voiced by Hideyuki Tanaka), a blind professional mahjong player with very accurate hearing. After defeating him, Akagi gains mythical status at 13 but then disappears, becoming a legendary figure all over Japan.

Six years later, Yasuoka orders Yukio Hirayama (平山 幸雄, Hirayama Yukio) (voiced by Ginpei Sato) to pretend to be Akagi to impress some yakuza bosses and make money. Meanwhile, Nangō finds the real Akagi, now aged 19 and working at a toy factory. Akagi, however, does not need to play with Hirayama as Hirayama is defeated by Urabe (浦部) (voiced by Morio Kazama), a professional mahjong player for another yakuza group who is later defeated by Akagi. Akagi's ultimate rival is Iwao Washizu (鷲巣 巌, Washizu Iwao) (voiced by Masane Tsukayama), an old man who has made a lot of money and become one of the most powerful people in the Japanese underworld. Having built up massive funds from shady dealings in Japan's post-war era, Washizu tempts people to bet their lives for the chance to win a large amount of money. Washizu and Akagi play mahjong in an unusual way that Washizu calls "Washizu Mahjong," in which transparent glass tiles replace most of the tiles and make the game different in many ways. Three years after the fight with Washizu, Akagi is last seen winning big in Tehonbiki, a gambling game that leaves no room for chance, and wandering around local gambling dens with Osamu Nozaki (野崎 治, Nozaki Osamu) (voiced by Yūdai Satō), a freckled young coworker from the toy factory they used to work at.

== Media ==
=== Manga ===
Akagi: Yami ni Oritatta Tensai, written and illustrated by Nobuyuki Fukumoto, is a spin-off of Fukumoto's 1989 manga series, Ten: Tenhōdōri no Kaidanji. Its first chapter was published in Takeshobo's magazine Kindai Mahjong on June 1, 1991. The manga's first tankōbon (collected volume) was released by Takeshobo on April 24, 1992. Some volumes—26 and 28—were published both on a regular and a special edition. The former had a 13-year-old Akagi plush doll as a bonus and the latter included a Zippo lighter in the format of a mahjong tile engraved with Akagi's and Washizu's faces. Its latest volume—the 36th—was published on June 27, 2018.

In February 2017, Takeshobo started to display eight different posters at 15 major railway stations on the Yamanote Line in Tokyo to announce the series planned conclusion on February 1, 2018. However, the series editor said it did not mean the manga would really reach its conclusion but that it would continue irregularly. To announce it one year before the ending was in fact a marketing strategy to attract the readers who quit reading the series and those who did not read it yet. A shinsōban three-on-one edition featuring new cover illustrations started to be published on February 15, 2017, and marked the start of what the editor called their one-year "grace period" as part of their tactic to attract readers. The 33rd and latest volume of this edition was published on December 26, 2017.

=== Related books and spin-offs ===
Several related books and spin-off manga have been released. A series of three mahjong commentary books illustrated by Makoto Fukuchi and titled Akagi Akuma no Senjutsu (アカギ悪魔の戦術; lit. 'Akagi: Diabolical Tactics') were released between May 17, 1999, and January 27, 2001. An anthology written by several other manga artists, including Clamp, Shinobu Kaitani and Mikio Igarashi, was released on July 27, 2011. An Akagi-themed mahjong introduction guide was released on two parts on July 27, 2011, and July 17, 2013. A character book was released on July 17, 2012, and an anthology compiling dōjinshi written at 2013 Comiket was released by Broccoli Books. Several crossovers between Akagi and Ten as well as between Akagi and Hero, another series by Fukumoto, have also been published by Takeshobo.

Washizu: Enma no Tōhai (ワシズ－閻魔の闘牌－; lit. 'Washizu: Lord of Mahjong Hell'), a spin-off manga written and illustrated by Keiichirō Hara focusing on Iwao Washizu's past escapades, was serialized in Monthly Kindai Mahjong Original starting on June 28, 2008. The series spawned eight volumes released between February 17, 2009, and January 26, 2013. Washizu: Enma no Tōhai was also published as two "B6 Series" released on October 27, 2012, and January 17, 2013. A one-shot on Washizu was also drawn by Clamp for Monthly Kindai Mahjong Original and released on August 8, 2008. On November 8, 2012, Monthly Kindai Mahjong Original published the first chapter of Washizu: Tenka Sōsei Tōhairoku (ワシズ 天下創世闘牌録; lit. 'Washizu: The Mahjong That Ruled a Nation'), a sequel to Enma no Tōhai, and it moved to the magazine Kindai Manga in May 2014. The spin-off series concluded as the fourth volume was released on May 15, 2015.

A "chapter 0" of a spin-off manga titled Yami-ma no Mamiya (闇麻のマミヤ; "Mamiya: Dark Mahjong"), written by Fukumoto, was published in Kindai Mahjong on May 1, 2019. The story is set 20 years after the events of Ten. The series started a regular serialization in the same magazine on July 1, 2019.

A prequel manga, titled Akagi: Nyūmon no Tōhai Zero (アカギ 入門の闘牌ZERO), by Tomoki Miyoshi and Yoshiaki Seto, with collaboration from Fukumoto, was published in Kindai Mahjong on April 1, 2024.

=== Anime ===
An anime adaptation of roughly 13 volumes of the manga, titled Tōhai Densetsu Akagi: Yami ni Maiorita Tensai (闘牌伝説アカギ 〜闇に舞い降りた天才〜; lit. 'Mahjong Legend Akagi: The Genius Who Descended Into the Darkness'), aired for 26 episodes on Nippon TV from October 5, 2005, to March 29, 2006. Produced by NTV, VAP, Forecast Communications and Madhouse, the series is directed by Yūzō Satō, with Hideo Takayashiki handling series composition, Takahiro Umehara designing the characters and Hideki Taniuchi composing the music. The anime's opening theme is "Nantoka Nare" (何とかなれ, "But It'll All Be Fine") by Furuido and its two ending themes are "Akagi" by Maximum the Hormone and "S.T.S." by Animals. In September 2013, streaming service Crunchyroll announced the licensing of the anime in the United States, Canada, the United Kingdom, Ireland, South Africa, Australia, New Zealand, the Caribbeans, and South and Central America. The first six episodes were available in these countries from September 10, 2013, with five more episodes streamed every week thereafter.

VAP compiled the series and released it as two DVD box sets on March 24, and May 24, 2006. Several types of tie-in merchandise were also released, such as an official guidebook published by Takeshobo on March 29, 2006 and a 35-track official soundtrack album published by VAP on January 25, 2006.

=== V-Cinema ===
Two V-Cinema film adaptations of Akagi have been released, produced by George Iida, directed by Kenzō Maihara, written by Mitsuru Tanabe, and composed by Yoshihiro Ike. Tōhai-den Akagi (闘牌伝アカギ, Mahjong Legend Akagi), an adaptation of the Ryūzaki/Yagi arc, was released November 11, 1995, while Janma Akagi (雀魔アカギ, Mahjong Devil Akagi), an adaptation of the Urabe arc, was released July 25, 1997. Takeshobo rereleased both films in DVD format on January 27, 2006. A video game based on the first film was released by Micronet for PlayStation on January 19, 1996.

=== Video games ===
Warashi adapted Akagi into a PlayStation 2 game released by D3 Publisher on December 12, 2002. It was rereleased as part of the budget-priced "Simple series" on October 14, 2004. In 2006, Taito released two mobile games based on the anime. Two video games based on the anime series were developed and published by Culture Brain. The first, a Game Boy Advance game, was released on March 3, 2006, and the second, for Nintendo DS, was released on August 9, 2007. Fujishoji released a pachislot machine in 2008, which was adapted by Sunsoft into a mobile version released in 2009. Okumura Yuuki released its first pachinko machine in 2008, which was followed by another in 2012. A smartphone game was developed by Imagineer and made available from March 5, 2014, while Gloops released a social network game for Mobage on August 1 of the same year. A new pachislot machine by Universal Entertainment was made available from April 24, 2017.

=== Drama ===
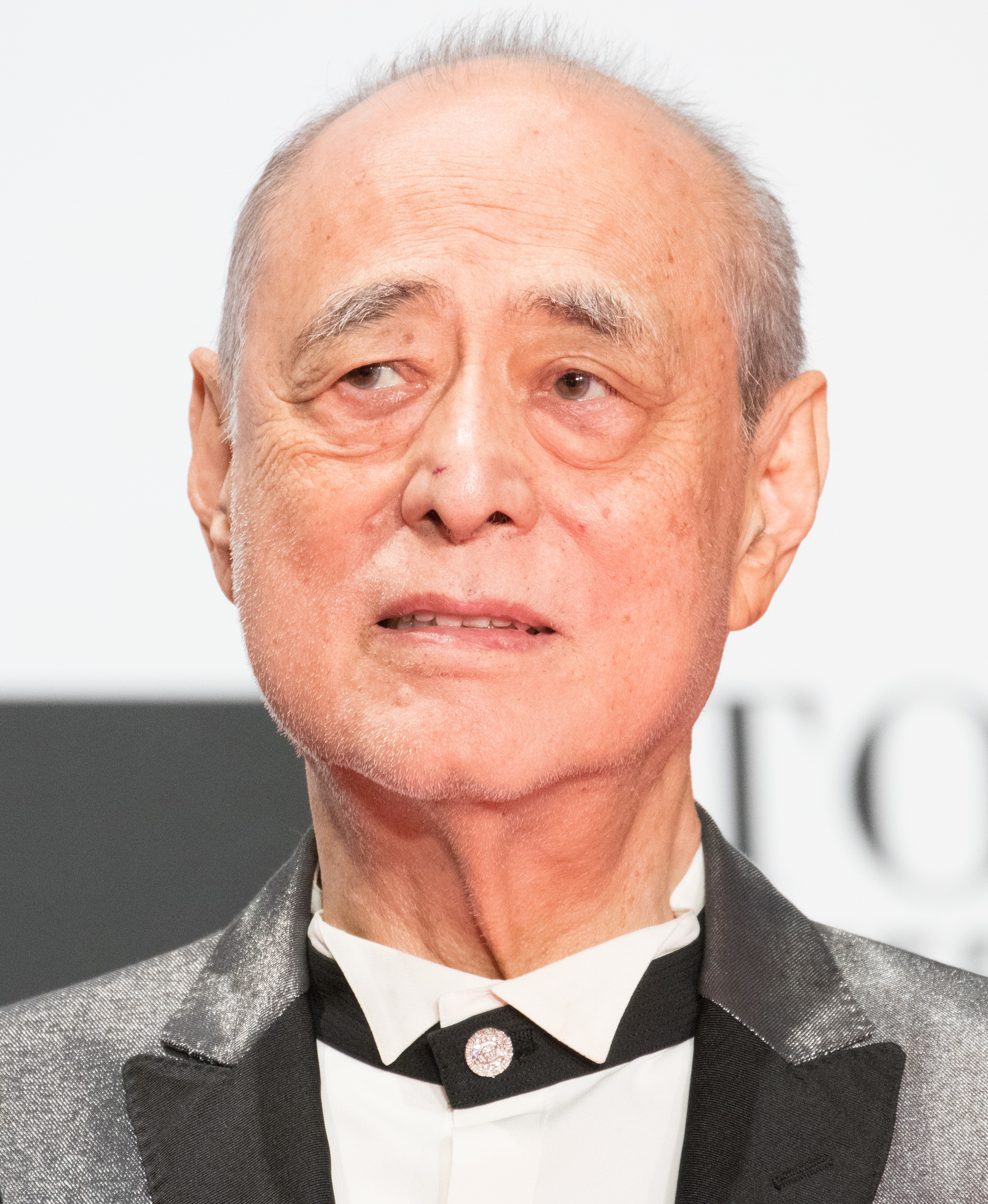
Masahiko Tsugawa plays Akagi's main rival, Washizu, in the live-action television adaptations.

A Japanese television drama that adapts the manga starting from its eighth volume aired on the channel BS SKY PerfecTV!. A ten-episode first season, directed by Mitsuru Kubota, Hitoshi Iwamoto and Hiroshi Itō, produced by Itō and Atsushi Nagauchi, and written by Mitsuru Tanabe and Eizō Kobayashi, was broadcast from July 17 to September 18, 2015. Kanata Hongō and Masahiko Tsugawa play Akagi and Washizu respectively, while its theme song, "Don't Be Afraid," is performed by Shōnan no Kaze. Crunchyroll licensed the drama for streaming it in about 150 countries. Pony Canyon released the series into a DVD box on March 2, 2016.

A five-episode sequel, Akagi: Ryūzaki–Yagi-hen / Ichikawa-hen (アカギ「竜崎・矢木編 /市川編」; lit. 'Akagi 'Ryūzaki–Yagi Arc' / 'Ichikawa Arc'), directed and produced by the same staff and written only by Tanabe, was broadcast on the same channel from October 13 to November 11, 2017. A three-episode sequel titled Akagi: Washizu Mahjong Kanketsu-hen (アカギ～鷲巣麻雀完結編～; lit. 'Akagi: Washizu Mahjong Concluding Chapter') was directed by Kubota, produced by Nagauchi and Itō, and written by Tanabe. Shōnan no Kaze announced a different theme song, "Kokushimusō" (国士無双, Thirteen Orphans), for the second sequel. The latter was broadcast from May 25 to June 8, 2018. A DVD box containing this two latter series was released by Pony Canyon on August 17, 2018.

== Reception ==
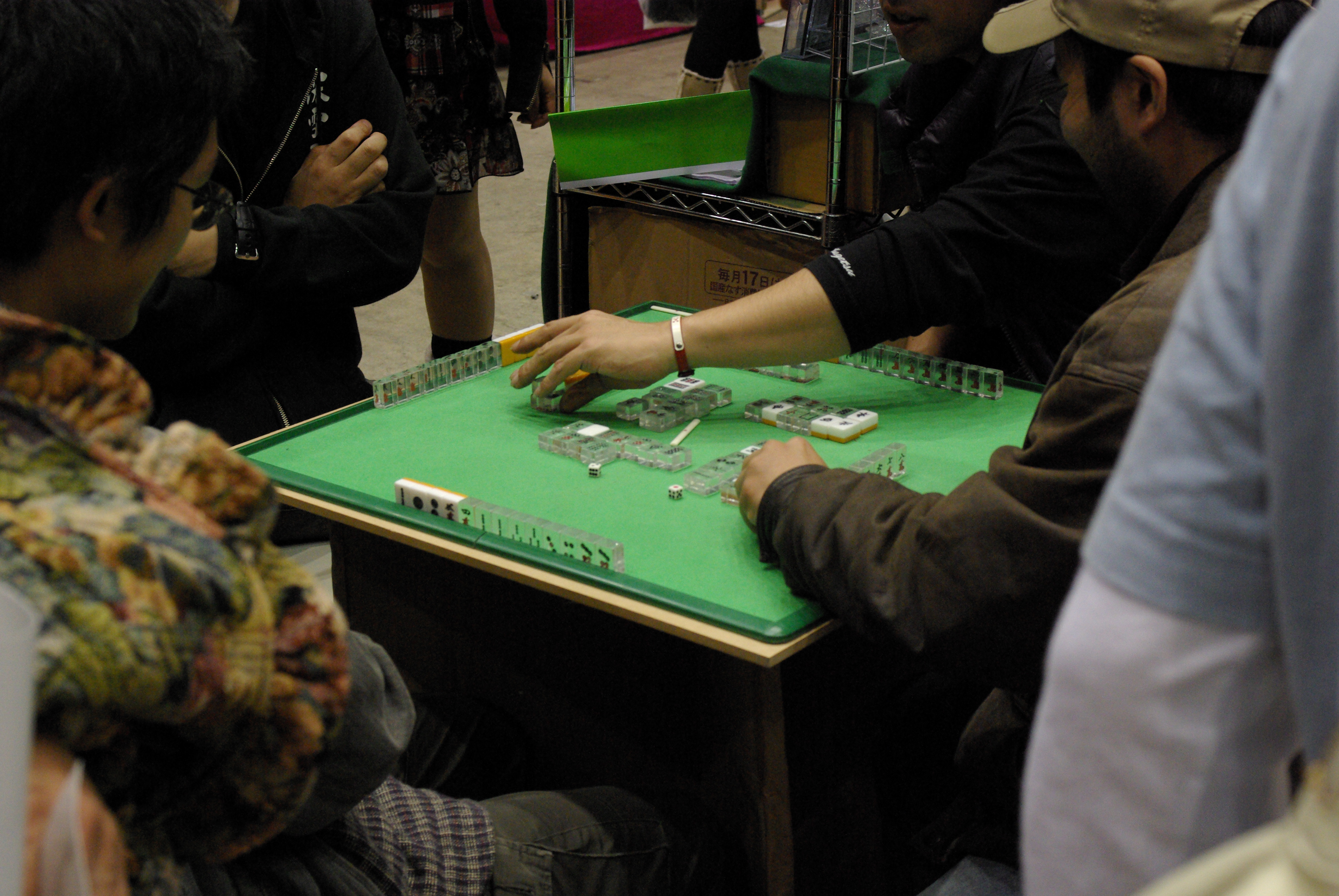
Mahjong played with transparent tiles, as featured in Akagi

=== Public response ===
By February 2017, the Akagi manga had over 12 million copies in circulation worldwide. Individual volumes have been featured in Oricon's weekly charts of best-selling manga in 2009, 2010, 2011, 2013, 2015, and 2016. The series has a cult following, and has aroused interest for mahjong in the West, especially in Russia, where it "ignited a boom". Nevertheless, Akagi has been surpassed in popularity by Fukumoto's other work, Kaiji.

=== Critical response ===
English-language reviewers have analyzed the anime adaptation more than the manga. David Cabrera of Otaku USA called Akagi a "nihilistic badass," highlighting how he can "psychologically dismantle a man." Both John Oppliger of AnimeNation and Anime News Network's Michael Toole compared it to Kaiji. Oppliger, however, stated that Kaiji relies on deus ex machina events but Akagi is based on "skilled gamesmanship." He opined that the series is "engrossing and addicting because of its smart, suspenseful writing." Toole found it reminiscent of a period piece due to the 1950–60's setting, calling it a "cool series" because of this. He also declared that "Akagi isn't about whether or not the title character will win—he will definitely win. It's about the joy of seeing how he wins, about observing a young man who seriously does not give a fuck relentlessly picking off bad guy after bad guy."

Bradley Meek wrote for THEM Anime Reviews how it differed from traditional sports anime, describing it as a "hard-boiled, grimy" anime in which "there's a tangible sense of danger". Concluding that "it has an appealing package, but not a lot of entertainment value. This anime is a dark tale about characters who gamble for very high stakes illegally in smoke filled rooms guarded by bulky men in sunglasses. There's a tangible sense of danger in this anime; when characters sweat over what their next move will be, they have a good reason". He also mentioned that he, as a layperson, could not understand the jargon of the mahjong matches that Akagi plays. UK Anime Network's Elliot Page gave the anime series an 8 out of 10, he argued that understanding mahjong was not necessary as the entertainment is provided not by the mahjong itself but by the characters' attitudes, and highlighted how the narrator provides further tension in the events. Page praised the uncommon animation style that, "while not amazing by any metric, are tuned to be highly expressive, dragging you into the action and the intensity of the moment". He also mentioned that the last arc does not finish in the anime series, and concluded with, "arguably this isn't very important in the grand scheme - as the main joy of the series is watching the mind games on display as the opponents try and mentally dismantle each other, which it does still deliver in spades".

== See also ==
- Gambling in Japan
