= Kindai Mahjong =

Japanese magazine line

Kindai Mahjong (Japanese: 近代麻雀, Hepburn: Kindai Mājan) is a mahjong-focused magazine line created by Takeshobo. The first title published under the line was the text magazine Monthly Kindai Mahjong (1972–1987). It has since then spawned four manga magazines: Kindai Mahjong Original (1980–2013), Bessatsu Kindai Mahjong (1981–present), Kindai Mahjong Gold (1985–2006), (Note: The initial dates of most magazines are disputed, and this article will give preference to the dates provided by Takeshobo. For example, while both Takeshobo and Frederick Schodt say Monthly Kindai Mahjong was created in 1972, the National Diet Library (NDL) reports its first issue was published in 1973. For Original, Schodt and NDL say it was established in 1977, but Takeshobo affirms it was in 1980. Bessatsu is said to have started in 1979 by Schodt, while Takeshobo states it was in 1981. Gold started in 1985, according to Takeshobo, while NDL and Schodt say that its initial publication was in 1987 and 1988 respectively.) and Kindai Mahjong Gamble Com (2006).

== History ==
Monthly Kindai Mahjong (月刊近代麻雀), described by Takeshobo as "Japan's first mahjong magazine", started in November 1972, one month after the publisher itself was established. It was mainly a text magazine, and it spawned a manga magazine in December 1980, Kindai Mahjong Original (月刊近代麻雀オリジナル). Two sister magazines, Monthly Bessatsu Kindai Mahjong (月刊別冊近代麻雀) and Kindai Mahjong Gold (月刊近代麻雀ゴールド), were created in December 1981 and August 1985. The original magazine went defunct in 1987, and then Bessatsu changed its title to simply Kindai Mahjong in 1997. In February 2006, Gold ceased its publication and, in March, it was replaced by the short-lived Kindai Mahjong Gamble Com (近代麻雀ギャンブルcom), whose issuance lasted until June 2006. Original had its last issue released in December 2013, and then was reconceptualized as a female character-centered seinen magazine titled Monthly Kissca, starting from January 2014.

== Content ==
All Kindai Mahjong magazines feature manga series that involve mahjong, although they can vary in genre from comedy to romance or science fiction. Despite the similarities, each has its own editorial staff, emphasis, slogan, and artist line-up. Bessatsu's focus is to promote tie-ins with other media, and as such features guest appearances by television personalities like Yoshikazu Ebisu, who wrote a manga in 1994. In addition to the manga, there are also informative articles. Gold, for example, constantly features mahjong former players, such as Shōichi Sakurai, who appears in photos, illustrating mahjong technique, and is portrayed as a character in manga. The magazine line also advertises mahjong parlors, and Original and Bessatsu also held women's mahjong tournaments and mahjong dating forums to attract female readers.

Among the most popular series published in the magazine line are Super Zugan (1981–1989) by Masayuki Katayama, Mahjong Hishō-den: Naki no Ryū (1985–1990) by Junichi Nōjo, Akagi (1991–2018) by Nobuyuki Fukumoto, and The Legend of Koizumi (2006–2015) by Hideki Ohwada. The magazines also frequently serialize mahjong spin-off of manga originally published in other magazine's series, such as adaptations of Higurashi When They Cry, Iron Wok Jan, and Getter Robo.

== Reception ==
By 1996, Original, Bessatsu and Gold had monthly circulation numbers around 180,000–200,000. At that time, the former two's average readership consisted of people aged 16–22, while the later was read by a public of more than 25 years old. Although most Kindai Mahjong readers are male, comedy manga such as Super Zugan, attracted a considerable female readership.

The Kindai Mahjong magazines were the only mahjong magazines that were not closed because of the effects of the Japanese asset price bubble in late 1980s. Although there were over ten publications in the genre, the recession and the "depressing image" the game had in that period, as Kindai Mahjong editor Michiyuki Miyaji put it, made most of them to close. Miyaji said one of the series that made possible the magazine line survival through that period was Naki no Ryū.
